This is a list of German football transfers in the summer transfer window 2011 by club. Only transfers of the Bundesliga and 2. Bundesliga are included.

Bundesliga

Borussia Dortmund

In:

Out:

|- class="vcard agent"
| style="text-align: right;" | 2 
| style="text-align: right;" |
| style="text-align: center;" | DF
|Julian Koch loan return from MSV Duisburg
|- class="vcard agent"
| style="text-align: right;" | 7 
| style="text-align: right;" |
| style="text-align: center;" | MF
|Moritz Leitner loan return from FC Augsburg
|- class="vcard agent"
| style="text-align: right;" | 14
| style="text-align: right;" |
| style="text-align: center;" | MF
|Ivan Perišić from Club Brugge
|- class="vcard agent"
| style="text-align: right;" | 21
| style="text-align: right;" |
| style="text-align: center;" | MF
|İlkay Gündoğan from 1. FC Nürnberg
|- class="vcard agent"
| style="text-align: right;" | 24
| style="text-align: right;" |
| style="text-align: center;" | DF
|Chris Löwe from Chemnitzer FC
|- class="vcard agent"
| style="text-align: right;" | 31
| style="text-align: right;" |
| style="text-align: center;" | MF
|Marvin Bakalorz from Borussia Dortmund II
|}
|}

|- class="vcard agent"
| style="text-align: right;" | 2 
| style="text-align: right;" |
| style="text-align: center;" | DF
|Lasse Sobiech on loan to FC St. Pauli
|- class="vcard agent"
| style="text-align: right;" | 8 
| style="text-align: right;" |
| style="text-align: center;" | MF
|Nuri Şahin to Real Madrid
|- class="vcard agent"
| style="text-align: right;" | 14
| style="text-align: right;" |
| style="text-align: center;" | MF
|Markus Feulner to 1. FC Nürnberg
|- class="vcard agent"
| style="text-align: right;" | 17
| style="text-align: right;" |
| style="text-align: center;" | DF
|Dedê to Eskişehirspor
|- class="vcard agent"
| style="text-align: right;" | 28
| style="text-align: right;" |
| style="text-align: center;" | FW
|Daniel Ginczek on loan to VfL Bochum
|- class="vcard agent"
| style="text-align: right;" | 30
| style="text-align: right;" |
| style="text-align: center;" | MF
|Tamás Hajnal to VfB Stuttgart, previously on loan
|- class="vcard agent"
| style="text-align: right;" | 39
| style="text-align: right;" |
| style="text-align: center;" | FW
|Marco Stiepermann on loan to Alemannia Aachen
|- class="vcard agent"
| style="text-align: right;" | --
| style="text-align: right;" |
| style="text-align: center;" | FW
|Dimitar Rangelov on loan to Energie Cottbus, previously on loan at Maccabi Tel Aviv
|}
|}

Bayer 04 Leverkusen

In:

|- class="vcard agent"
| style="text-align: right;" | 4 
| style="text-align: right;" |
| style="text-align: center;" | DF
|Bastian Oczipka loan return from FC St. Pauli
|- class="vcard agent"
| style="text-align: right;" | 9 
| style="text-align: right;" |
| style="text-align: center;" | FW
|André Schürrle from 1. FSV Mainz 05
|- class="vcard agent"
| style="text-align: right;" | 17
| style="text-align: right;" |
| style="text-align: center;" | MF
|Michael Javier Ortega on loan from Club Atlas
|- class="vcard agent"
| style="text-align: right;" | 21
| style="text-align: right;" |
| style="text-align: center;" | DF
|Ömer Toprak from SC Freiburg
|- class="vcard agent"
| style="text-align: right;" | 22
| style="text-align: right;" |
| style="text-align: center;" | GK
|David Yelldell from MSV Duisburg
|- class="vcard agent"
| style="text-align: right;" | 23
| style="text-align: right;" |
| style="text-align: center;" | GK
|Bernd Leno on loan from VfB Stuttgart
|- class="vcard agent"
| style="text-align: right;" | 38
| style="text-align: right;" |
| style="text-align: center;" | FW
|Karim Bellarabi from Eintracht Braunschweig
|}
|}

Out:

|- class="vcard agent"
| style="text-align: right;" | 4 
| style="text-align: right;" |
| style="text-align: center;" | DF
|Sami Hyypiä retired
|- class="vcard agent"
| style="text-align: right;" | 17
| style="text-align: right;" |
| style="text-align: center;" | DF
|Domagoj Vida to Dinamo Zagreb
|- class="vcard agent"
| style="text-align: right;" | 22
| style="text-align: right;" |
| style="text-align: center;" | GK
|Benedikt Fernandez released
|- class="vcard agent"
| style="text-align: right;" | 23
| style="text-align: right;" |
| style="text-align: center;" | MF
|Arturo Vidal to Juventus
|- class="vcard agent"
| style="text-align: right;" | 26
| style="text-align: right;" |
| style="text-align: center;" | MF
|Kevin Kampl to VfL Osnabrück
|- class="vcard agent"
| style="text-align: right;" | 33
| style="text-align: right;" |
| style="text-align: center;" | GK
|Tomasz Bobel retired
|- class="vcard agent"
| style="text-align: right;" | --
| style="text-align: right;" |
| style="text-align: center;" | MF
|Marcel Risse to 1. FSV Mainz 05, previously on loan
|- class="vcard agent"
| style="text-align: right;" | --
| style="text-align: right;" |
| style="text-align: center;" | MF
|Zvonko Pamić on loan to MSV Duisburg, previously on loan at SC Freiburg
|- class="vcard agent"
| style="text-align: right;" | --
| style="text-align: right;" |
| style="text-align: center;" | MF
|Burak Kaplan to Beşiktaş J.K., previously on loan at SpVgg Greuther Fürth
|- class="vcard agent"
| style="text-align: right;" | --
| style="text-align: right;" |
| style="text-align: center;" | DF
|Constant Djakpa to Eintracht Frankfurt, previously on loan at Hannover 96
|- class="vcard agent"
| style="text-align: right;" | --
| style="text-align: right;" |
| style="text-align: center;" | FW
|Richard Sukuta-Pasu to 1. FC Kaiserslautern, previously on loan at FC St. Pauli
|}
|}

FC Bayern Munich

In:

|- class="vcard agent"
| style="text-align: right;" | 1 
| style="text-align: right;" |
| style="text-align: center;" | GK
|Manuel Neuer from Schalke 04
|- class="vcard agent"
| style="text-align: right;" | 9 
| style="text-align: right;" |
| style="text-align: center;" | FW
|Nils Petersen from Energie Cottbus
|- class="vcard agent"
| style="text-align: right;" | 13
| style="text-align: right;" |
| style="text-align: center;" | DF
|Rafinha from Genoa C.F.C.
|- class="vcard agent"
| style="text-align: right;" | 14
| style="text-align: right;" |
| style="text-align: center;" | FW
|Takashi Usami on loan from Gamba Osaka
|- class="vcard agent"
| style="text-align: right;" | 17
| style="text-align: right;" |
| style="text-align: center;" | DF
|Jérôme Boateng from Manchester City
|- class="vcard agent"
| style="text-align: right;" | 24
| style="text-align: right;" |
| style="text-align: center;" | GK
|Maximilian Riedmüller from Bayern Munich II
|- class="vcard agent"
| style="text-align: right;" | 27
| style="text-align: right;" |
| style="text-align: center;" | MF
|David Alaba loan return from 1899 Hoffenheim
|}
|}

Out:

|- class="vcard agent"
| style="text-align: right;" | 8 
| style="text-align: right;" |
| style="text-align: center;" | MF
|Hamit Altıntop to Real Madrid
|- class="vcard agent"
| style="text-align: right;" | 16
| style="text-align: right;" |
| style="text-align: center;" | MF
|Andreas Ottl to Hertha BSC
|- class="vcard agent"
| style="text-align: right;" | 18
| style="text-align: right;" |
| style="text-align: center;" | FW
|Miroslav Klose to S.S. Lazio
|- class="vcard agent"
| style="text-align: right;" | 32
| style="text-align: right;" |
| style="text-align: center;" | MF
|Mehmet Ekici to Werder Bremen, previously on loan at 1. FC Nürnberg
|- class="vcard agent"
| style="text-align: right;" | 35
| style="text-align: right;" |
| style="text-align: center;" | GK
|Thomas Kraft to Hertha BSC
|}
|}

Hannover 96

In:

|- class="vcard agent"
| style="text-align: right;" | 9 
| style="text-align: right;" |
| style="text-align: center;" | FW
|Artur Sobiech from Polonia Warszawa
|- class="vcard agent"
| style="text-align: right;" | 15
| style="text-align: right;" |
| style="text-align: center;" | MF
|Henning Hauger from Stabæk Fotball
|- class="vcard agent"
| style="text-align: right;" | 16
| style="text-align: right;" |
| style="text-align: center;" | MF
|Daniel Royer from SV Ried
|- class="vcard agent"
| style="text-align: right;" | 21
| style="text-align: right;" |
| style="text-align: center;" | GK
|Samuel Radlinger from SV Ried
|- class="vcard agent"
| style="text-align: right;" | 24
| style="text-align: right;" |
| style="text-align: center;" | MF
|Christian Pander from FC Schalke 04
|- class="vcard agent"
| style="text-align: right;" | 26
| style="text-align: right;" |
| style="text-align: center;" | MF
|Deniz Ayçiçek from Hannover 96 Youth
|- class="vcard agent"
| style="text-align: right;" | 27
| style="text-align: right;" |
| style="text-align: center;" | DF
|Erdal Akdarı from Hannover 96 Youth
|}
|}

Out:

|- class="vcard agent"
| style="text-align: right;" | 1 
| style="text-align: right;" |
| style="text-align: center;" | GK
|Florian Fromlowitz to MSV Duisburg
|- class="vcard agent"
| style="text-align: right;" | 15
| style="text-align: right;" |
| style="text-align: center;" | DF
|Constant Djakpa loan return to Bayer 04 Leverkusen
|- class="vcard agent"
| style="text-align: right;" | 16
| style="text-align: right;" |
| style="text-align: center;" | MF
|DaMarcus Beasley to Puebla F.C.
|- class="vcard agent"
| style="text-align: right;" | 37
| style="text-align: right;" |
| style="text-align: center;" | DF
|Felix Burmeister to Arminia Bielefeld
|}
|}

1. FSV Mainz 05

In:

|- class="vcard agent"
| style="text-align: right;" | 3 
| style="text-align: right;" |
| style="text-align: center;" | DF
|Zdeněk Pospěch from F.C. Copenhagen
|- class="vcard agent"
| style="text-align: right;" | 7 
| style="text-align: right;" |
| style="text-align: center;" | MF
|Eugen Polanski from Getafe CF, previously on loan
|- class="vcard agent"
| style="text-align: right;" | 10
| style="text-align: right;" |
| style="text-align: center;" | FW
|Eric Maxim Choupo-Moting from Hamburger SV
|- class="vcard agent"
| style="text-align: right;" | 11
| style="text-align: right;" |
| style="text-align: center;" | MF
|Yunus Mallı from Borussia Mönchengladbach II
|- class="vcard agent"
| style="text-align: right;" | 13
| style="text-align: right;" |
| style="text-align: center;" | FW
|Anthony Ujah from Lillestrøm SK
|- class="vcard agent"
| style="text-align: right;" | 14
| style="text-align: right;" |
| style="text-align: center;" | MF
|Julian Baumgartlinger from FK Austria Wien
|- class="vcard agent"
| style="text-align: right;" | 17
| style="text-align: right;" |
| style="text-align: center;" | MF
|Zoltán Stieber from Alemannia Aachen
|- class="vcard agent"
| style="text-align: right;" | 22
| style="text-align: right;" |
| style="text-align: center;" | FW
|Mario Gavranović on loan from FC Schalke 04
|- class="vcard agent"
| style="text-align: right;" | 23
| style="text-align: right;" |
| style="text-align: center;" | MF
|Marcel Risse from Bayer 04 Leverkusen, previously on loan
|- class="vcard agent"
| style="text-align: right;" | 24
| style="text-align: right;" |
| style="text-align: center;" | DF
|Malik Fathi from Spartak Moscow, previously on loan
|- class="vcard agent"
| style="text-align: right;" | 27
| style="text-align: right;" |
| style="text-align: center;" | MF
|Nicolai Müller from SpVgg Greuther Fürth
|- class="vcard agent"
| style="text-align: right;" | 30
| style="text-align: right;" |
| style="text-align: center;" | FW
|Deniz Yılmaz from Bayern Munich II
|- class="vcard agent"
| style="text-align: right;" | 34
| style="text-align: right;" |
| style="text-align: center;" | DF
|Fabian Schönheim from Wehen Wiesbaden
|}
|}

Out:

|- class="vcard agent"
| style="text-align: right;" | 1 
| style="text-align: right;" |
| style="text-align: center;" | GK
|Martin Pieckenhagen retired
|- class="vcard agent"
| style="text-align: right;" | 10
| style="text-align: right;" |
| style="text-align: center;" | MF
|Jan Šimák to FC Carl Zeiss Jena
|- class="vcard agent"
| style="text-align: right;" | 14
| style="text-align: right;" |
| style="text-align: center;" | FW
|André Schürrle to Bayer 04 Leverkusen
|- class="vcard agent"
| style="text-align: right;" | 18
| style="text-align: right;" |
| style="text-align: center;" | MF
|Lewis Holtby loan return to FC Schalke 04
|- class="vcard agent"
| style="text-align: right;" | 21
| style="text-align: right;" |
| style="text-align: center;" | MF
|Miroslav Karhan to Spartak Trnava
|- class="vcard agent"
| style="text-align: right;" | 22
| style="text-align: right;" |
| style="text-align: center;" | DF
|Christian Fuchs to FC Schalke 04, previously on loan at VfL Bochum
|- class="vcard agent"
| style="text-align: right;" | --
| style="text-align: right;" |
| style="text-align: center;" | DF
|Stefan Bell to Eintracht Frankfurt, previously on loan at 1860 Munich
|- class="vcard agent"
| style="text-align: right;" | --
| style="text-align: right;" |
| style="text-align: center;" | MF
|Filip Trojan to Dynamo Dresden, previously on loan at MSV Duisburg
|}
|}

1. FC Nürnberg

In:

|- class="vcard agent"
| style="text-align: right;" | 7 
| style="text-align: right;" |
| style="text-align: center;" | MF
|Markus Feulner from Borussia Dortmund
|- class="vcard agent"
| style="text-align: right;" | 9 
| style="text-align: right;" |
| style="text-align: center;" | FW
|Tomáš Pekhart from FK Baumit Jablonec, previously on loan at Sparta Prague
|- class="vcard agent"
| style="text-align: right;" | 15
| style="text-align: right;" |
| style="text-align: center;" | DF
|Timm Klose from FC Thun
|- class="vcard agent"
| style="text-align: right;" | 20
| style="text-align: right;" |
| style="text-align: center;" | MF
|Daniel Didavi on loan from VfB Stuttgart
|- class="vcard agent"
| style="text-align: right;" | 28
| style="text-align: right;" |
| style="text-align: center;" | MF
|Manuel Zeitz from 1. FC Saarbrücken
|- class="vcard agent"
| style="text-align: right;" | 33
| style="text-align: right;" |
| style="text-align: center;" | FW
|Alexander Esswein from Dynamo Dresden
|}
|}

Out:

|- class="vcard agent"
| style="text-align: right;" | 5 
| style="text-align: right;" |
| style="text-align: center;" | DF
|Andreas Wolf to Werder Bremen
|- class="vcard agent"
| style="text-align: right;" | 11
| style="text-align: right;" |
| style="text-align: center;" | MF
|Marek Mintál to Hansa Rostock
|- class="vcard agent"
| style="text-align: right;" | 15
| style="text-align: right;" |
| style="text-align: center;" | MF
|Christoph Sauter on loan to VfR Aalen
|- class="vcard agent"
| style="text-align: right;" | 19
| style="text-align: right;" |
| style="text-align: center;" | FW
|Nassim Ben Khalifa loan return to VfL Wolfsburg
|- class="vcard agent"
| style="text-align: right;" | 20
| style="text-align: right;" |
| style="text-align: center;" | MF
|Pascal Bieler to Wehen Wiesbaden
|- class="vcard agent"
| style="text-align: right;" | 22
| style="text-align: right;" |
| style="text-align: center;" | MF
|İlkay Gündoğan to Borussia Dortmund
|- class="vcard agent"
| style="text-align: right;" | 23
| style="text-align: right;" |
| style="text-align: center;" | FW
|Julian Schieber loan return to VfB Stuttgart
|- class="vcard agent"
| style="text-align: right;" | 24
| style="text-align: right;" |
| style="text-align: center;" | GK
|Timo Ochs to 1860 Munich
|- class="vcard agent"
| style="text-align: right;" | 32
| style="text-align: right;" |
| style="text-align: center;" | GK
|Daniel Batz to SC Freiburg
|- class="vcard agent"
| style="text-align: right;" | 37
| style="text-align: right;" |
| style="text-align: center;" | MF
|Mehmet Ekici loan return to Bayern Munich
|- class="vcard agent"
| style="text-align: right;" | --
| style="text-align: right;" |
| style="text-align: center;" | FW
|Dario Vidošić to Adelaide United FC, previously on loan at Arminia Bielefeld
|- class="vcard agent"
| style="text-align: right;" | --
| style="text-align: right;" |
| style="text-align: center;" | DF
|Felicio Brown Forbes to Rot-Weiß Oberhausen, previously on loan at FC Carl Zeiss Jena
|}
|}

1. FC Kaiserslautern

In:

|- class="vcard agent"
| style="text-align: right;" | 9 
| style="text-align: right;" |
| style="text-align: center;" | FW
|Itay Shechter from Hapoel Tel Aviv F.C.
|- class="vcard agent"
| style="text-align: right;" | 10
| style="text-align: right;" |
| style="text-align: center;" | MF
|Olcay Şahan from MSV Duisburg
|- class="vcard agent"
| style="text-align: right;" | 14
| style="text-align: right;" |
| style="text-align: center;" | MF
|Gil Vermouth from Hapoel Tel Aviv F.C.
|- class="vcard agent"
| style="text-align: right;" | 16
| style="text-align: right;" |
| style="text-align: center;" | FW
|Richard Sukuta-Pasu from Bayer 04 Leverkusen, previously on loan at FC St. Pauli
|- class="vcard agent"
| style="text-align: right;" | 28
| style="text-align: right;" |
| style="text-align: center;" | MF
|Kostas Fortounis from Asteras Tripolis
|- class="vcard agent"
| style="text-align: right;" | 30
| style="text-align: right;" |
| style="text-align: center;" | FW
|Dorge Kouemaha on loan from Club Brugge
|}
|}

Out:

|- class="vcard agent"
| style="text-align: right;" | 4 
| style="text-align: right;" |
| style="text-align: center;" | MF
|Bastian Schulz to RB Leipzig
|- class="vcard agent"
| style="text-align: right;" | 9 
| style="text-align: right;" |
| style="text-align: center;" | FW
|Srđan Lakić to VfL Wolfsburg
|- class="vcard agent"
| style="text-align: right;" | 16
| style="text-align: right;" |
| style="text-align: center;" | MF
|Jan Morávek loan return to FC Schalke 04
|- class="vcard agent"
| style="text-align: right;" | 24
| style="text-align: right;" |
| style="text-align: center;" | MF
|Adam Hloušek loan return to Slavia Prague
|- class="vcard agent"
| style="text-align: right;" | 22
| style="text-align: right;" |
| style="text-align: center;" | MF
|Ivo Iličević to Hamburger SV
|- class="vcard agent"
| style="text-align: right;" | 33
| style="text-align: right;" |
| style="text-align: center;" | FW
|Erwin Hoffer loan return to S.S.C. Napoli
|}
|}

Hamburger SV

In:

|- class="vcard agent"
| style="text-align: right;" | 3
| style="text-align: right;" |
| style="text-align: center;" | DF
|Michael Mancienne from Chelsea, previously on loan at Wolverhampton Wanderers
|- class="vcard agent"
| style="text-align: right;" | 5 
| style="text-align: right;" |
| style="text-align: center;" | DF
|Jeffrey Bruma on loan from Chelsea
|- class="vcard agent"
| style="text-align: right;" | 11
| style="text-align: right;" |
| style="text-align: center;" | MF
|Ivo Iličević from 1. FC Kaiserslautern
|- class="vcard agent"
| style="text-align: right;" | 16
| style="text-align: right;" |
| style="text-align: center;" | FW
|Marcus Berg loan return from PSV Eindhoven
|- class="vcard agent"
| style="text-align: right;" | 17
| style="text-align: right;" |
| style="text-align: center;" | FW
|Gökhan Töre from Chelsea Reserves
|- class="vcard agent"
| style="text-align: right;" | 22
| style="text-align: right;" |
| style="text-align: center;" | MF
|Jacopo Sala from Chelsea
|- class="vcard agent"
| style="text-align: right;" | 23
| style="text-align: right;" |
| style="text-align: center;" | DF
|Slobodan Rajković from Chelsea FC
|- class="vcard agent"
| style="text-align: right;" | 25 
| style="text-align: right;" |
| style="text-align: center;" | MF
|Per Ciljan Skjelbred from Rosenborg BK
|- class="vcard agent"
| style="text-align: right;" | 27
| style="text-align: right;" |
| style="text-align: center;" | MF
|Sören Bertram loan return from FC Augsburg
|- class="vcard agent"
| style="text-align: right;" | 28
| style="text-align: right;" |
| style="text-align: center;" | MF
|Tolgay Arslan loan return from Alemannia Aachen
|- class="vcard agent"
| style="text-align: right;" | 30
| style="text-align: right;" |
| style="text-align: center;" | GK
|Wolfgang Hesl loan return form SV Ried
|- class="vcard agent"
| style="text-align: right;" | 42
| style="text-align: right;" |
| style="text-align: center;" | MF
|Mickaël Tavares loan return from Middlesbrough
|}
|}

Out:

|- class="vcard agent"
| style="text-align: right;" | 1 
| style="text-align: right;" |
| style="text-align: center;" | GK
|Frank Rost to New York Red Bulls
|- class="vcard agent"
| style="text-align: right;" | 5 
| style="text-align: right;" |
| style="text-align: center;" | DF
|Joris Mathijsen to Málaga CF
|- class="vcard agent"
| style="text-align: right;" | 8 
| style="text-align: right;" |
| style="text-align: center;" | MF
|Zé Roberto to Al-Gharafa Sports Club
|- class="vcard agent"
| style="text-align: right;" | 11
| style="text-align: right;" |
| style="text-align: center;" | FW
|Elijero Elia to Juventus
|- class="vcard agent"
| style="text-align: right;" | 15
| style="text-align: right;" |
| style="text-align: center;" | MF
|Piotr Trochowski to Sevilla FC
|- class="vcard agent"
| style="text-align: right;" | 17
| style="text-align: right;" |
| style="text-align: center;" | FW
|Eric Maxim Choupo-Moting to 1. FSV Mainz 05
|- class="vcard agent"
| style="text-align: right;" | 20
| style="text-align: right;" |
| style="text-align: center;" | DF
|Guy Demel to West Ham United
|- class="vcard agent"
| style="text-align: right;" | 21
| style="text-align: right;" |
| style="text-align: center;" | MF
|Jonathan Pitroipa to Stade Rennais F.C.
|- class="vcard agent"
| style="text-align: right;" | 22
| style="text-align: right;" |
| style="text-align: center;" | FW
|Ruud van Nistelrooy to Málaga CF
|- class="vcard agent"
| style="text-align: right;" | 30
| style="text-align: right;" |
| style="text-align: center;" | DF
|Collin Benjamin to 1860 Munich
|- class="vcard agent"
| style="text-align: right;" | 32
| style="text-align: right;" |
| style="text-align: center;" | MF
|Änis Ben-Hatira to Hertha BSC
|- class="vcard agent"
| style="text-align: right;" | 35
| style="text-align: right;" |
| style="text-align: center;" | FW
|Tunay Torun to Hertha BSC
|- class="vcard agent"
| style="text-align: right;" | --
| style="text-align: right;" |
| style="text-align: center;" | FW
|Macauley Chrisantus on loan to FSV Frankfurt, previously on loan at Karlsruher SC
|- class="vcard agent"
| style="text-align: right;" | --
| style="text-align: right;" |
| style="text-align: center;" | DF
|Kai-Fabian Schulz to FC Carl Zeiss Jena, previously on loan at FSV Frankfurt
|- class="vcard agent"
| style="text-align: right;" | --
| style="text-align: right;" |
| style="text-align: center;" | DF
|David Rozehnal to Lille OSC, previously on loan
|}
|}

SC Freiburg

In:

|- class="vcard agent"
| style="text-align: right;" | 4 
| style="text-align: right;" |
| style="text-align: center;" | DF
|Beg Ferati from FC Basel
|- class="vcard agent"
| style="text-align: right;" | 19
| style="text-align: right;" |
| style="text-align: center;" | GK
|Daniel Batz from 1. FC Nürnberg
|- class="vcard agent"
| style="text-align: right;" | 29
| style="text-align: right;" |
| style="text-align: center;" | MF
|Christian Bickel from SC Freiburg II
|- class="vcard agent"
| style="text-align: right;" | 33
| style="text-align: right;" |
| style="text-align: center;" | FW
|Simon Brandstetter from SC Freiburg II
|- class="vcard agent"
| style="text-align: right;" | 39
| style="text-align: right;" |
| style="text-align: center;" | FW
|Garra Dembélé from Levski Sofia
|}
|}

Out:

|- class="vcard agent"
| style="text-align: right;" | 1 
| style="text-align: right;" |
| style="text-align: center;" | GK
|Simon Pouplin released
|- class="vcard agent"
| style="text-align: right;" | 13
| style="text-align: right;" |
| style="text-align: center;" | FW
|Tommy Bechmann to SønderjyskE
|- class="vcard agent"
| style="text-align: right;" | 14
| style="text-align: right;" |
| style="text-align: center;" | MF
|Zvonko Pamić loan return to Bayer 04 Leverkusen
|- class="vcard agent"
| style="text-align: right;" | 20
| style="text-align: right;" |
| style="text-align: center;" | MF
|Ivica Banović to Energie Cottbus, previously on loan at MSV Duisburg
|- class="vcard agent"
| style="text-align: right;" | 28
| style="text-align: right;" |
| style="text-align: center;" | MF
|Danny Williams to 1899 Hoffenheim
|- class="vcard agent"
| style="text-align: right;" | 31
| style="text-align: right;" |
| style="text-align: center;" | MF
|Nicolas Höfler on loan to Erzgebirge Aue
|- class="vcard agent"
| style="text-align: right;" | 58
| style="text-align: right;" |
| style="text-align: center;" | DF
|Ömer Toprak to Bayer 04 Leverkusen
|}
|}

1. FC Köln

In:

|- class="vcard agent"
| style="text-align: right;" | 5 
| style="text-align: right;" |
| style="text-align: center;" | DF
|Sascha Riether  from VfL Wolfsburg
|- class="vcard agent"
| style="text-align: right;" | 17
| style="text-align: right;" |
| style="text-align: center;" | DF
|Henrique Sereno  on loan from FC Porto
|- class="vcard agent"
| style="text-align: right;" | 28
| style="text-align: right;" |
| style="text-align: center;" | MF
|Odise Roshi from KS Flamurtari Vlorë
|}
|}

Out:

|- class="vcard agent"
| style="text-align: right;" | 3 
| style="text-align: right;" |
| style="text-align: center;" | DF
|Youssef Mohamad to Al-Ahli Dubai
|- class="vcard agent"
| style="text-align: right;" | 6 
| style="text-align: right;" |
| style="text-align: center;" | MF
|Taner Yalçın on loan to İstanbul BB
|- class="vcard agent"
| style="text-align: right;" | 9 
| style="text-align: right;" |
| style="text-align: center;" | FW
|Manasseh Ishiaku released, previously on loan at K. Sint-Truidense V.V.
|- class="vcard agent"
| style="text-align: right;" | 16
| style="text-align: right;" |
| style="text-align: center;" | DF
|Christopher Schorch on loan to Energie Cottbus
|- class="vcard agent"
| style="text-align: right;" | 18
| style="text-align: right;" |
| style="text-align: center;" | MF
|Kostas Giannoulis on loan to Atromitos F.C.
|- class="vcard agent"
| style="text-align: right;" | 19
| style="text-align: right;" |
| style="text-align: center;" | MF
|Mato Jajalo loan return to A.C. Siena
|- class="vcard agent"
| style="text-align: right;" | 22
| style="text-align: right;" |
| style="text-align: center;" | MF
|Fabrice Ehret to Evian Thonon Gaillard F.C.
|- class="vcard agent"
| style="text-align: right;" | 30
| style="text-align: right;" |
| style="text-align: center;" | FW
|Simon Terodde on loan to 1. FC Union Berlin
|- class="vcard agent"
| style="text-align: right;" | 32
| style="text-align: right;" |
| style="text-align: center;" | DF
|Stephan Salger to VfL Osnabrück
|- class="vcard agent"
| style="text-align: right;" | 37
| style="text-align: right;" |
| style="text-align: center;" | MF
|Reinhold Yabo on loan to Alemannia Aachen
|- class="vcard agent"
| style="text-align: right;" | --
| style="text-align: right;" |
| style="text-align: center;" | GK
|Thomas Kessler on loan to Eintracht Frankfurt, previously on loan at FC St. Pauli
|- class="vcard agent"
| style="text-align: right;" | --
| style="text-align: right;" |
| style="text-align: center;" | FW
|José Pierre Vunguidica on loan to Preußen Münster, previously on loan at Kickers Offenbach
|- class="vcard agent"
| style="text-align: right;" | --
| style="text-align: right;" |
| style="text-align: center;" | MF
|Michael Gardawski to VfL Osnabrück, previously on loan at VfB Stuttgart II
|}
|}

TSG 1899 Hoffenheim

In:

|- class="vcard agent"
| style="text-align: right;" | 9 
| style="text-align: right;" |
| style="text-align: center;" | FW
|Sven Schipplock from VfB Stuttgart
|- class="vcard agent"
| style="text-align: right;" | 13
| style="text-align: right;" |
| style="text-align: center;" | MF
|Danny Williams from SC Freiburg
|- class="vcard agent"
| style="text-align: right;" | 16
| style="text-align: right;" |
| style="text-align: center;" | DF
|Fabian Johnson from VfL Wolfsburg
|- class="vcard agent"
| style="text-align: right;" | 21
| style="text-align: right;" |
| style="text-align: center;" | MF
|Dominik Kaiser from 1899 Hoffenheim II
|- class="vcard agent"
| style="text-align: right;" | 27
| style="text-align: right;" |
| style="text-align: center;" | DF
|Jukka Raitala loan return form SC Paderborn 07
|- class="vcard agent"
| style="text-align: right;" | 30
| style="text-align: right;" |
| style="text-align: center;" | GK
|Koen Casteels from K.R.C. Genk
|- class="vcard agent"
| style="text-align: right;" | 36
| style="text-align: right;" |
| style="text-align: center;" | MF
|Franco Zuculini loan return from Racing Club de Avellaneda
|- class="vcard agent"
| style="text-align: right;" | --
| style="text-align: right;" |
| style="text-align: center;" | FW
|Michael Gregoritsch from Kapfenberger SV
|- class="vcard agent"
| style="text-align: right;" | 8
| style="text-align: right;" |
| style="text-align: center;" | FW
|Knowledge Musona from Kaizer Chiefs
|}
|}

Out:

|- class="vcard agent"
| style="text-align: right;" | 8 
| style="text-align: right;" |
| style="text-align: center;" | MF
|David Alaba loan return to Bayern Munich
|- class="vcard agent"
| style="text-align: right;" | 14
| style="text-align: right;" |
| style="text-align: center;" | DF
|Josip Šimunić to Dinamo Zagreb
|- class="vcard agent"
| style="text-align: right;" | 18
| style="text-align: right;" |
| style="text-align: center;" | FW
|Prince Tagoe to Bursaspor, previously on loan at FK Partizan
|- class="vcard agent"
| style="text-align: right;" | 27
| style="text-align: right;" |
| style="text-align: center;" | GK
|Ramazan Özcan to FC Ingolstadt 04
|- class="vcard agent"
| style="text-align: right;" | 30
| style="text-align: right;" |
| style="text-align: center;" | GK
|Jens Grahl on loan to SC Paderborn 07
|- class="vcard agent"
| style="text-align: right;" | --
| style="text-align: right;" |
| style="text-align: center;" | FW
|Michael Gregoritsch on loan to Kapfenberger SV
|}
|}

VfB Stuttgart

In:

|- class="vcard agent"
| style="text-align: right;" | 4
| style="text-align: right;" |
| style="text-align: center;" | MF
|William Kvist from F.C. Copenhagen
|- class="vcard agent"
| style="text-align: right;" | 14
| style="text-align: right;" |
| style="text-align: center;" | DF
|Maza from PSV Eindhoven
|- class="vcard agent"
| style="text-align: right;" | 16
| style="text-align: right;" |
| style="text-align: center;" | MF
|Ibrahima Traoré from FC Augsburg
|- class="vcard agent"
| style="text-align: right;" | 23
| style="text-align: right;" |
| style="text-align: center;" | FW
|Julian Schieber loan return from 1. FC Nürnberg
|- class="vcard agent"
| style="text-align: right;" | 28
| style="text-align: right;" |
| style="text-align: center;" | MF
|Tamás Hajnal from Borussia Dortmund, previously on loan
|}
|}

Out:

|- class="vcard agent"
| style="text-align: right;" | 2 
| style="text-align: right;" |
| style="text-align: center;" | DF
|Philipp Degen loan return to Liverpool
|- class="vcard agent"
| style="text-align: right;" | 9 
| style="text-align: right;" |
| style="text-align: center;" | FW
|Ciprian Marica to FC Schalke 04
|- class="vcard agent"
| style="text-align: right;" | 14
| style="text-align: right;" |
| style="text-align: center;" | MF
|Patrick Funk on loan to FC St. Pauli
|- class="vcard agent"
| style="text-align: right;" | 25
| style="text-align: right;" |
| style="text-align: center;" | MF
|Élson released
|- class="vcard agent"
| style="text-align: right;" | 26
| style="text-align: right;" |
| style="text-align: center;" | MF
|Daniel Didavi on loan to 1. FC Nürnberg
|- class="vcard agent"
| style="text-align: right;" | 30
| style="text-align: right;" |
| style="text-align: center;" | GK
|Bernd Leno on loan to Bayer 04 Leverkusen
|- class="vcard agent"
| style="text-align: right;" | 35
| style="text-align: right;" |
| style="text-align: center;" | DF
|Christian Träsch to VfL Wolfsburg
|- class="vcard agent"
| style="text-align: right;" | 36
| style="text-align: right;" |
| style="text-align: center;" | FW
|Sven Schipplock to TSG 1899 Hoffenheim
|}
|}

Werder Bremen

In:

|- class="vcard agent"
| style="text-align: right;" | 11
| style="text-align: right;" |
| style="text-align: center;" | FW
|Markus Rosenberg loan return from Racing de Santander
|- class="vcard agent"
| style="text-align: right;" | 13
| style="text-align: right;" |
| style="text-align: center;" | MF
|Lukas Schmitz from FC Schalke 04
|- class="vcard agent"
| style="text-align: right;" | 17
| style="text-align: right;" |
| style="text-align: center;" | MF
|Aleksandar Ignjovski from OFK Beograd, previously on loan at 1860 Munich
|- class="vcard agent"
| style="text-align: right;" | 20
| style="text-align: right;" |
| style="text-align: center;" | MF
|Mehmet Ekici from Bayern Munich, previously on loan at 1. FC Nürnberg
|- class="vcard agent"
| style="text-align: right;" | 22
| style="text-align: right;" |
| style="text-align: center;" | DF
|Sokratis Papastathopoulos on loan from Genoa C.F.C.
|- class="vcard agent"
| style="text-align: right;" | 23
| style="text-align: right;" |
| style="text-align: center;" | DF
|Andreas Wolf from 1. FC Nürnberg
|- class="vcard agent"
| style="text-align: right;" | 25
| style="text-align: right;" |
| style="text-align: center;" | MF
|Tom Trybull from Hansa Rostock
|- class="vcard agent"
| style="text-align: right;" | 30
| style="text-align: right;" |
| style="text-align: center;" | FW
|Márkó Futács loan return from FC Ingolstadt 04
|- class="vcard agent"
| style="text-align: right;" | 34
| style="text-align: right;" |
| style="text-align: center;" | MF
|Aleksandar Stevanović from FC Schalke 04 Youth
|}
|}

Out:

|- class="vcard agent"
| style="text-align: right;" | 3 
| style="text-align: right;" |
| style="text-align: center;" | DF
|Petri Pasanen to FC Red Bull Salzburg
|- class="vcard agent"
| style="text-align: right;" | 20
| style="text-align: right;" |
| style="text-align: center;" | MF
|Daniel Jensen released
|- class="vcard agent"
| style="text-align: right;" | 22
| style="text-align: right;" |
| style="text-align: center;" | MF
|Torsten Frings to Toronto FC
|- class="vcard agent"
| style="text-align: right;" | 25
| style="text-align: right;" |
| style="text-align: center;" | DF
|Samuel to R.S.C. Anderlecht
|- class="vcard agent"
| style="text-align: right;" | 28
| style="text-align: right;" |
| style="text-align: center;" | FW
|Kevin Schindler to FC St. Pauli
|- class="vcard agent"
| style="text-align: right;" | 29
| style="text-align: right;" |
| style="text-align: center;" | DF
|Per Mertesacker to Arsenal F.C.
|- class="vcard agent"
| style="text-align: right;" | 41
| style="text-align: right;" |
| style="text-align: center;" | DF
|Dominik Schmidt to Eintracht Frankfurt
|- class="vcard agent"
| style="text-align: right;" | 42
| style="text-align: right;" |
| style="text-align: center;" | GK
|Felix Wiedwald to MSV Duisburg
|- class="vcard agent"
| style="text-align: right;" | 43
| style="text-align: right;" |
| style="text-align: center;" | FW
|Pascal Testroet to Kickers Offenbach
|- class="vcard agent"
| style="text-align: right;" | 45
| style="text-align: right;" |
| style="text-align: center;" | MF
|Timo Perthel to Hansa Rostock, previously on loan at Sturm Graz
|- class="vcard agent"
| style="text-align: right;" | --
| style="text-align: right;" |
| style="text-align: center;" | FW
|John Jairo Mosquera to 1. FC Union Berlin, previously on loan
|- class="vcard agent"
| style="text-align: right;" | --
| style="text-align: right;" |
| style="text-align: center;" | MF
|Peter Niemeyer to Hertha BSC, previously on loan
|- class="vcard agent"
| style="text-align: right;" | --
| style="text-align: right;" |
| style="text-align: center;" | MF
|Jurica Vranješ released
|}
|}

FC Schalke 04

In:

|- class="vcard agent"
| style="text-align: right;" | 1
| style="text-align: right;" |
| style="text-align: center;" | GK
|Ralf Fährmann from Eintracht Frankfurt
|- class="vcard agent"
| style="text-align: right;" | 8
| style="text-align: right;" |
| style="text-align: center;" | FW
|Ciprian Marica from VfB Stuttgart
|- class="vcard agent"
| style="text-align: right;" | 10
| style="text-align: right;" |
| style="text-align: center;" | MF
|Lewis Holtby loan return from 1. FSV Mainz 05
|- class="vcard agent"
| style="text-align: right;" | 12
| style="text-align: right;" |
| style="text-align: center;" | MF
|Marco Höger from Alemannia Aachen
|- class="vcard agent"
| style="text-align: right;" | 13
| style="text-align: right;" |
| style="text-align: center;" | MF
|Jermaine Jones loan return from Blackburn Rovers
|- class="vcard agent"
| style="text-align: right;" | 16
| style="text-align: right;" |
| style="text-align: center;" | MF
|Jan Morávek loan return from 1. FC Kaiserslautern
|- class="vcard agent"
| style="text-align: right;" | 20
| style="text-align: right;" |
| style="text-align: center;" | FW
|Teemu Pukki from HJK Helsinki
|- class="vcard agent"
| style="text-align: right;" | 23
| style="text-align: right;" |
| style="text-align: center;" | DF
|Christian Fuchs from 1. FSV Mainz 05
|}
|}

Out:

|- class="vcard agent"
| style="text-align: right;" | 1 
| style="text-align: right;" |
| style="text-align: center;" | GK
|Manuel Neuer to Bayern Munich
|- class="vcard agent"
| style="text-align: right;" | 5 
| style="text-align: right;" |
| style="text-align: center;" | DF
|Nicolas Plestan released
|- class="vcard agent"
| style="text-align: right;" | 8 
| style="text-align: right;" |
| style="text-align: center;" | MF
|Hao Junmin to Shandong Luneng Taishan F.C.
|- class="vcard agent"
| style="text-align: right;" | 9 
| style="text-align: right;" |
| style="text-align: center;" | FW
|Edu on loan to Beşiktaş J.K.
|- class="vcard agent"
| style="text-align: right;" | 10
| style="text-align: right;" |
| style="text-align: center;" | MF
|Ali Karimi to Persepolis
|- class="vcard agent"
| style="text-align: right;" | 13
| style="text-align: right;" |
| style="text-align: center;" | DF
|Lukas Schmitz to Werder Bremen
|- class="vcard agent"
| style="text-align: right;" | 15
| style="text-align: right;" |
| style="text-align: center;" | FW
|Angelos Charisteas to Panetolikos F.C.
|- class="vcard agent"
| style="text-align: right;" | 19
| style="text-align: right;" |
| style="text-align: center;" | FW
|Mario Gavranović on loan to 1. FSV Mainz 05
|- class="vcard agent"
| style="text-align: right;" | 20
| style="text-align: right;" |
| style="text-align: center;" | MF
|Vasileios Pliatsikas on loan to MSV Duisburg
|- class="vcard agent"
| style="text-align: right;" | 23
| style="text-align: right;" |
| style="text-align: center;" | DF
|Danilo Avelar loan return to Karpaty Lviv
|- class="vcard agent"
| style="text-align: right;" | 24
| style="text-align: right;" |
| style="text-align: center;" | MF
|Christian Pander to Hannover 96
|- class="vcard agent"
| style="text-align: right;" | 27
| style="text-align: right;" |
| style="text-align: center;" | MF
|Ciprian Deac on loan to Rapid București
|- class="vcard agent"
| style="text-align: right;" | 40
| style="text-align: right;" |
| style="text-align: center;" | MF
|Anthony Annan on loan to Vitesse Arnhem
|- class="vcard agent"
| style="text-align: right;" | --
| style="text-align: right;" |
| style="text-align: center;" | MF
|Tore Reginiussen to Odense BK, previously on loan at Tromsø IL
|- class="vcard agent"
| style="text-align: right;" | --
| style="text-align: right;" |
| style="text-align: center;" | FW
|Gerald Asamoah released, previously on loan at FC St. Pauli
|}
|}

VfL Wolfsburg

In:

|- class="vcard agent"
| style="text-align: right;" | 2 
| style="text-align: right;" |
| style="text-align: center;" | DF
|Patrick Ochs from Eintracht Frankfurt
|- class="vcard agent"
| style="text-align: right;" | 6 
| style="text-align: right;" |
| style="text-align: center;" | MF
|Aleksandr Hleb from FC Barcelona, previously on loan at Birmingham City
|- class="vcard agent"
| style="text-align: right;" | 9 
| style="text-align: right;" |
| style="text-align: center;" | FW
|Srđan Lakić from 1. FC Kaiserslautern
|- class="vcard agent"
| style="text-align: right;" | 10
| style="text-align: right;" |
| style="text-align: center;" | MF
|Thomas Hitzlsperger from West Ham United
|- class="vcard agent"
| style="text-align: right;" | 11
| style="text-align: right;" |
| style="text-align: center;" | DF
|Hasan Salihamidžić from Juventus F.C.
|- class="vcard agent"
| style="text-align: right;" | 15
| style="text-align: right;" |
| style="text-align: center;" | DF
|Christian Träsch from VfB Stuttgart
|- class="vcard agent"
| style="text-align: right;" | 16
| style="text-align: right;" |
| style="text-align: center;" | DF
|Sotirios Kyrgiakos from Liverpool
|- class="vcard agent"
| style="text-align: right;" | 20
| style="text-align: right;" |
| style="text-align: center;" | FW
|Rasmus Jönsson from Helsingborgs IF
|- class="vcard agent"
| style="text-align: right;" | 22
| style="text-align: right;" |
| style="text-align: center;" | MF
|Mateusz Klich from Cracovia
|- class="vcard agent"
| style="text-align: right;" | 23
| style="text-align: right;" |
| style="text-align: center;" | DF
|Marco Russ from Eintracht Frankfurt
|- class="vcard agent"
| style="text-align: right;" | 25
| style="text-align: right;" |
| style="text-align: center;" | DF
|Chris from Eintracht Frankfurt
|- class="vcard agent"
| style="text-align: right;" | 26
| style="text-align: right;" |
| style="text-align: center;" | DF
|Hrvoje Čale from Trabzonspor
|}
|}

Out:

|- class="vcard agent"
| style="text-align: right;" | 11
| style="text-align: right;" |
| style="text-align: center;" | MF
|Cícero loan return to Tombense
|- class="vcard agent"
| style="text-align: right;" | 15
| style="text-align: right;" |
| style="text-align: center;" | MF
|Karim Ziani to Kayserispor, previously on loan
|- class="vcard agent"
| style="text-align: right;" | 16
| style="text-align: right;" |
| style="text-align: center;" | DF
|Fabian Johnson to 1899 Hoffenheim
|- class="vcard agent"
| style="text-align: right;" | 22
| style="text-align: right;" |
| style="text-align: center;" | MF
|Kevin Wolze to MSV Duisburg
|- class="vcard agent"
| style="text-align: right;" | 23
| style="text-align: right;" |
| style="text-align: center;" | FW
|Grafite to Al-Ahli Dubai
|- class="vcard agent"
| style="text-align: right;" | 25
| style="text-align: right;" |
| style="text-align: center;" | FW
|Dieumerci Mbokani loan return to AS Monaco
|- class="vcard agent"
| style="text-align: right;" | 27
| style="text-align: right;" |
| style="text-align: center;" | MF
|Akaki Gogia on loan to FC Augsburg
|- class="vcard agent"
| style="text-align: right;" | 28
| style="text-align: right;" |
| style="text-align: center;" | MF
|Diego on loan to Atlético Madrid
|- class="vcard agent"
| style="text-align: right;" | 34
| style="text-align: right;" |
| style="text-align: center;" | DF
|Simon Kjær on loan to A.S. Roma
|- class="vcard agent"
| style="text-align: right;" | 37
| style="text-align: right;" |
| style="text-align: center;" | DF
|Sergei Karimov to MSV Duisburg
|- class="vcard agent"
| style="text-align: right;" | --
| style="text-align: right;" |
| style="text-align: center;" | FW
|Nassim Ben Khalifa on loan to BSC Young Boys, previously on loan at 1. FC Nürnberg
|}
|}

Borussia Mönchengladbach

In:

|- class="vcard agent"
| style="text-align: right;" | 2
| style="text-align: right;" |
| style="text-align: center;" | DF
|Matthias Zimmermann from Karlsruher SC
|- class="vcard agent"
| style="text-align: right;" | 8
| style="text-align: right;" |
| style="text-align: center;" | MF
|Lukas Rupp from Karlsruher SC
|- class="vcard agent"
| style="text-align: right;" | 9
| style="text-align: right;" |
| style="text-align: center;" | MF
|Raúl Bobadilla loan return from Aris Thessaloniki
|- class="vcard agent"
| style="text-align: right;" | 15
| style="text-align: right;" |
| style="text-align: center;" | FW
|Joshua King on loan from Manchester United
|- class="vcard agent"
| style="text-align: right;" | 17
| style="text-align: right;" |
| style="text-align: center;" | DF
|Oscar Wendt from F.C. Copenhagen
|- class="vcard agent"
| style="text-align: right;" | 20
| style="text-align: right;" |
| style="text-align: center;" | FW
|Mathew Leckie from Adelaide United
|- class="vcard agent"
| style="text-align: right;" | 23
| style="text-align: right;" |
| style="text-align: center;" | MF
|Yuki Otsu from Kashiwa Reysol
|- class="vcard agent"
| style="text-align: right;" | 26
| style="text-align: right;" |
| style="text-align: center;" | MF
|Michael Bradley loan return from Aston Villa
|}
|}

Out:

|- class="vcard agent"
| style="text-align: right;" | 2 
| style="text-align: right;" |
| style="text-align: center;" | DF
|Sebastian Schachten to FC St. Pauli
|- class="vcard agent"
| style="text-align: right;" | 5 
| style="text-align: right;" |
| style="text-align: center;" | DF
|Anderson Bamba on loan to Eintracht Frankfurt
|- class="vcard agent"
| style="text-align: right;" | 6 
| style="text-align: right;" |
| style="text-align: center;" | MF
|Michael Fink loan return to Beşiktaş J.K.
|- class="vcard agent"
| style="text-align: right;" | 20
| style="text-align: right;" |
| style="text-align: center;" | DF
|Jean-Sébastien Jaurès retired
|- class="vcard agent"
| style="text-align: right;" | 23
| style="text-align: right;" |
| style="text-align: center;" | DF
|Christian Dorda to SpVgg Greuther Fürth
|- class="vcard agent"
| style="text-align: right;" | 25
| style="text-align: right;" |
| style="text-align: center;" | FW
|Mohamadou Idrissou to Eintracht Frankfurt
|- class="vcard agent"
| style="text-align: right;" | 27
| style="text-align: right;" |
| style="text-align: center;" | DF
|Jens Wissing to SC Paderborn 07
|- class="vcard agent"
| style="text-align: right;" | 29
| style="text-align: right;" |
| style="text-align: center;" | FW
|Fabian Bäcker to Alemannia Aachen
|- class="vcard agent"
| style="text-align: right;" | 30
| style="text-align: right;" |
| style="text-align: center;" | GK
|Logan Bailly on loan to Neuchâtel Xamax
|- class="vcard agent"
| style="text-align: right;" | 40
| style="text-align: right;" |
| style="text-align: center;" | FW
|Karim Matmour to Eintracht Frankfurt
|- class="vcard agent"
| style="text-align: right;" | --
| style="text-align: right;" |
| style="text-align: center;" | MF
|Marcel Meeuwis to VVV-Venlo, previously on loan at Feyenoord
|}
|}

Hertha BSC

In:

|- class="vcard agent"
| style="text-align: right;" | 7 
| style="text-align: right;" |
| style="text-align: center;" | DF
|Maik Franz from Eintracht Frankfurt
|- class="vcard agent"
| style="text-align: right;" | 8 
| style="text-align: right;" |
| style="text-align: center;" | MF
|Andreas Ottl from Bayern Munich
|- class="vcard agent"
| style="text-align: right;" | 11
| style="text-align: right;" |
| style="text-align: center;" | FW
|Tunay Torun from Hamburger SV
|- class="vcard agent"
| style="text-align: right;" | 17
| style="text-align: right;" |
| style="text-align: center;" | MF
|Änis Ben-Hatira from Hamburger SV
|- class="vcard agent"
| style="text-align: right;" | 18
| style="text-align: right;" |
| style="text-align: center;" | MF
|Peter Niemeyer from Werder Bremen, previously on loan
|- class="vcard agent"
| style="text-align: right;" | 24
| style="text-align: right;" |
| style="text-align: center;" | DF
|John Brooks from Hertha BSC II
|- class="vcard agent"
| style="text-align: right;" | 33
| style="text-align: right;" |
| style="text-align: center;" | FW
|Abu-Bakarr Kargbo from Hertha BSC II
|- class="vcard agent"
| style="text-align: right;" | 35
| style="text-align: right;" |
| style="text-align: center;" | GK
|Thomas Kraft from Bayern Munich
|}
|}

Out:

|- class="vcard agent"
| style="text-align: right;" | 15
| style="text-align: right;" |
| style="text-align: center;" | MF
|Sascha Bigalke to SpVgg Unterhaching
|- class="vcard agent"
| style="text-align: right;" | 16
| style="text-align: right;" |
| style="text-align: center;" | FW
|Rob Friend to Eintracht Frankfurt
|- class="vcard agent"
| style="text-align: right;" | 17
| style="text-align: right;" |
| style="text-align: center;" | FW
|Valeri Domovchiyski to MSV Duisburg
|- class="vcard agent"
| style="text-align: right;" | 25
| style="text-align: right;" |
| style="text-align: center;" | DF
|Lennart Hartmann to Alemannia Aachen
|- class="vcard agent"
| style="text-align: right;" | 27
| style="text-align: right;" |
| style="text-align: center;" | MF
|Marvin Knoll on loan to Dynamo Dresden
|- class="vcard agent"
| style="text-align: right;" | --
| style="text-align: right;" |
| style="text-align: center;" | MF
|Daniel Beichler on loan to MSV Duisburg, previously on loan at FC St. Gallen
|- class="vcard agent"
| style="text-align: right;" | --
| style="text-align: right;" |
| style="text-align: center;" | DF
|Kaká on loan to APOEL, previously on loan at S.C. Braga
|}
|}

FC Augsburg

In:

|- class="vcard agent"
| style="text-align: right;" | 15
| style="text-align: right;" |
| style="text-align: center;" | DF
|Sebastian Langkamp from Karlsruher SC
|- class="vcard agent"
| style="text-align: right;" | 19
| style="text-align: right;" |
| style="text-align: center;" | FW
|Patrick Mayer from 1. FC Heidenheim
|- class="vcard agent"
| style="text-align: right;" | 21
| style="text-align: right;" |
| style="text-align: center;" | DF
|Dominic Peitz from 1. FC Union Berlin
|- class="vcard agent"
| style="text-align: right;" | 22
| style="text-align: right;" |
| style="text-align: center;" | FW
|Edmond Kapllani loan return from SC Paderborn 07
|- class="vcard agent"
| style="text-align: right;" | 25
| style="text-align: right;" |
| style="text-align: center;" | FW
|Dawda Bah from HJK Helsinki
|- class="vcard agent"
| style="text-align: right;" | 26
| style="text-align: right;" |
| style="text-align: center;" | MF
|Lorenzo Davids from NEC
|- class="vcard agent"
| style="text-align: right;" | 28
| style="text-align: right;" |
| style="text-align: center;" | MF
|Akaki Gogia on loan from VfL Wolfsburg
|- class="vcard agent"
| style="text-align: right;" | 33
| style="text-align: right;" |
| style="text-align: center;" | FW
|Sascha Mölders from FSV Frankfurt
|}
|}

Out:

|- class="vcard agent"
| style="text-align: right;" | 14
| style="text-align: right;" |
| style="text-align: center;" | MF
|Kees Kwakman to FC Groningen
|- class="vcard agent"
| style="text-align: right;" | 16
| style="text-align: right;" |
| style="text-align: center;" | MF
|Ibrahima Traoré to VfB Stuttgart
|- class="vcard agent"
| style="text-align: right;" | 19
| style="text-align: right;" |
| style="text-align: center;" | MF
|Sören Bertram loan return to Hamburger SV
|- class="vcard agent"
| style="text-align: right;" | 21
| style="text-align: right;" |
| style="text-align: center;" | DF
|Dominic Peitz on loan to Hansa Rostock
|- class="vcard agent"
| style="text-align: right;" | 22
| style="text-align: right;" |
| style="text-align: center;" | DF
|Lukas Sinkiewicz to VfL Bochum
|- class="vcard agent"
| style="text-align: right;" | 27
| style="text-align: right;" |
| style="text-align: center;" | FW
|Michael Thurk released
|- class="vcard agent"
| style="text-align: right;" | 28
| style="text-align: right;" |
| style="text-align: center;" | MF
|Moritz Leitner loan return to Borussia Dortmund
|- class="vcard agent"
| style="text-align: right;" | 33
| style="text-align: right;" |
| style="text-align: center;" | MF
|Daniel Framberger to TSV Neusäß
|}
|}

2. Bundesliga

Eintracht Frankfurt

In:

|- class="vcard agent"
| style="text-align: right;" | 4 
| style="text-align: right;" |
| style="text-align: center;" | DF
|Gordon Schildenfeld from SK Sturm Graz
|- class="vcard agent"
| style="text-align: right;" | 5 
| style="text-align: right;" |
| style="text-align: center;" | DF
|Stefan Bell from 1. FSV Mainz 05, previously on loan at 1860 Munich
|- class="vcard agent"
| style="text-align: right;" | 6 
| style="text-align: right;" |
| style="text-align: center;" | DF
|Dominik Schmidt from Werder Bremen
|- class="vcard agent"
| style="text-align: right;" | 8 
| style="text-align: right;" |
| style="text-align: center;" | MF
|Matthias Lehmann from FC St. Pauli
|- class="vcard agent"
| style="text-align: right;" | 10
| style="text-align: right;" |
| style="text-align: center;" | FW
|Erwin Hoffer on loan from S.S.C. Napoli, previously on loan at 1. FC Kaiserslautern
|- class="vcard agent"
| style="text-align: right;" | 11
| style="text-align: right;" |
| style="text-align: center;" | MF
|Ümit Korkmaz loan return form VfL Bochum
|- class="vcard agent"
| style="text-align: right;" | 15
| style="text-align: right;" |
| style="text-align: center;" | DF
|Constant Djakpa from Bayer 04 Leverkusen, previously on loan at Hannover 96
|- class="vcard agent"
| style="text-align: right;" | 18
| style="text-align: right;" |
| style="text-align: center;" | FW
|Mohammadou Idrissou from Borussia Mönchengladbach
|- class="vcard agent"
| style="text-align: right;" | 19
| style="text-align: right;" |
| style="text-align: center;" | DF
|Habib Bellaïd loan return from CS Sedan Ardennes
|- class="vcard agent"
| style="text-align: right;" | 21
| style="text-align: right;" |
| style="text-align: center;" | FW
|Karim Matmour from Borussia Mönchengladbach
|- class="vcard agent"
| style="text-align: right;" | 22
| style="text-align: right;" |
| style="text-align: center;" | GK
|Thomas Kessler on loan from 1. FC Köln, previously on loan at FC St. Pauli
|- class="vcard agent"
| style="text-align: right;" | 23
| style="text-align: right;" |
| style="text-align: center;" | DF
|Anderson Bamba on loan from Borussia Mönchengladbach
|- class="vcard agent"
| style="text-align: right;" | 25
| style="text-align: right;" |
| style="text-align: center;" | FW
|Marcos Alvarez from Bayern Munich II
|- class="vcard agent"
| style="text-align: right;" | --
| style="text-align: right;" |
| style="text-align: center;" | FW
|Rob Friend from Hertha BSC
|}
|}

Out:

|- class="vcard agent"
| style="text-align: right;" | 2 
| style="text-align: right;" |
| style="text-align: center;" | DF
|Patrick Ochs to VfL Wolfsburg
|- class="vcard agent"
| style="text-align: right;" | 3 
| style="text-align: right;" |
| style="text-align: center;" | DF
|Nikola Petković to Red Star Belgrade, previously on loan at Al-Ahli
|- class="vcard agent"
| style="text-align: right;" | 4 
| style="text-align: right;" |
| style="text-align: center;" | DF
|Maik Franz to Hertha BSC
|- class="vcard agent"
| style="text-align: right;" | 10
| style="text-align: right;" |
| style="text-align: center;" | MF
|Halil Altıntop to Trabzonspor
|- class="vcard agent"
| style="text-align: right;" | 17
| style="text-align: right;" |
| style="text-align: center;" | FW
|Martin Fenin to Energie Cottbus
|- class="vcard agent"
| style="text-align: right;" | 18
| style="text-align: right;" |
| style="text-align: center;" | FW
|Ioannis Amanatidis released
|- class="vcard agent"
| style="text-align: right;" | 19
| style="text-align: right;" |
| style="text-align: center;" | DF
|Kevin Kraus to SpVgg Greuther Fürth
|- class="vcard agent"
| style="text-align: right;" | 22
| style="text-align: right;" |
| style="text-align: center;" | GK
|Ralf Fährmann to FC Schalke 04
|- class="vcard agent"
| style="text-align: right;" | 23
| style="text-align: right;" |
| style="text-align: center;" | DF
|Marco Russ to VfL Wolfsburg
|- class="vcard agent"
| style="text-align: right;" | 25
| style="text-align: right;" |
| style="text-align: center;" | MF
|Marcel Heller to Dynamo Dresden
|- class="vcard agent"
| style="text-align: right;" | 29
| style="text-align: right;" |
| style="text-align: center;" | DF
|Chris to VfL Wolfsburg
|}
|}

FC St. Pauli

In:

|- class="vcard agent"
| style="text-align: right;" | 3 
| style="text-align: right;" |
| style="text-align: center;" | DF
|Lasse Sobiech on loan from Borussia Dortmund
|- class="vcard agent"
| style="text-align: right;" | 6 
| style="text-align: right;" |
| style="text-align: center;" | MF
|Patrick Funk on loan from VfB Stuttgart
|- class="vcard agent"
| style="text-align: right;" | 13
| style="text-align: right;" |
| style="text-align: center;" | GK
|Philipp Tschauner from 1860 Munich
|- class="vcard agent"
| style="text-align: right;" | 19
| style="text-align: right;" |
| style="text-align: center;" | FW
|Mahir Sağlık from VfL Bochum
|- class="vcard agent"
| style="text-align: right;" | 20
| style="text-align: right;" |
| style="text-align: center;" | DF
|Sebastian Schachten from Borussia Mönchengladbach
|- class="vcard agent"
| style="text-align: right;" | 25
| style="text-align: right;" |
| style="text-align: center;" | MF
|Kevin Schindler from Werder Bremen
|}
|}

Out:

|- class="vcard agent"
| style="text-align: right;" | 2 
| style="text-align: right;" |
| style="text-align: center;" | DF
|Florian Lechner to Karlsruher SC
|- class="vcard agent"
| style="text-align: right;" | 6 
| style="text-align: right;" |
| style="text-align: center;" | DF
|Bastian Oczipka loan return to Bayer 04 Leverkusen
|- class="vcard agent"
| style="text-align: right;" | 13
| style="text-align: right;" |
| style="text-align: center;" | FW
|Gerald Asamoah loan return to FC Schalke 04
|- class="vcard agent"
| style="text-align: right;" | 14
| style="text-align: right;" |
| style="text-align: center;" | DF
|Marcel Eger to Brentford F.C.
|- class="vcard agent"
| style="text-align: right;" | 19
| style="text-align: right;" |
| style="text-align: center;" | FW
|Richard Sukuta-Pasu loan return to Bayer 04 Leverkusen
|- class="vcard agent"
| style="text-align: right;" | 20
| style="text-align: right;" |
| style="text-align: center;" | MF
|Matthias Lehmann to Eintracht Frankfurt
|- class="vcard agent"
| style="text-align: right;" | 25
| style="text-align: right;" |
| style="text-align: center;" | GK
|Mathias Hain retired
|- class="vcard agent"
| style="text-align: right;" | 26
| style="text-align: right;" |
| style="text-align: center;" | GK
|Thomas Kessler loan return to 1. FC Köln
|- class="vcard agent"
| style="text-align: right;" | 32
| style="text-align: right;" |
| style="text-align: center;" | DF
|Davidson Drobo-Ampem on loan to Esbjerg fB, previously on loan
|}
|}

VfL Bochum

In:

|- class="vcard agent"
| style="text-align: right;" | 6
| style="text-align: right;" |
| style="text-align: center;" | DF
|Lukas Sinkiewicz from FC Augsburg
|- class="vcard agent"
| style="text-align: right;" | 11
| style="text-align: right;" |
| style="text-align: center;" | MF
|Takashi Inui from Cerezo Osaka
|- class="vcard agent"
| style="text-align: right;" | 14
| style="text-align: right;" |
| style="text-align: center;" | MF
|Denis Berger from Kickers Offenbach
|- class="vcard agent"
| style="text-align: right;" | 15
| style="text-align: right;" |
| style="text-align: center;" | DF
|Hólmar Örn Eyjólfsson from West Ham United F.C.
|- class="vcard agent"
| style="text-align: right;" | 21
| style="text-align: right;" |
| style="text-align: center;" | FW
|Daniel Ginczek on loan from Borussia Dortmund
|- class="vcard agent"
| style="text-align: right;" | 23
| style="text-align: right;" |
| style="text-align: center;" | MF
|Christoph Kramer on loan from Bayer 04 Leverkusen II
|- class="vcard agent"
| style="text-align: right;" | 26
| style="text-align: right;" |
| style="text-align: center;" | DF
|Jonas Acquistapace from VfL Bochum II
|- class="vcard agent"
| style="text-align: right;" | 32
| style="text-align: right;" |
| style="text-align: center;" | MF
|Enes Uzun from VfL Wolfsburg Youth
|- class="vcard agent"
| style="text-align: right;" | 34
| style="text-align: right;" |
| style="text-align: center;" | GK
|Jonas Ermes from VfL Bochum II
|}
|}

Out:

|- class="vcard agent"
| style="text-align: right;" | 11
| style="text-align: right;" |
| style="text-align: center;" | FW
|Mahir Sağlık to FC St. Pauli
|- class="vcard agent"
| style="text-align: right;" | 15
| style="text-align: right;" |
| style="text-align: center;" | FW
|Roman Prokoph to Kapfenberger SV
|- class="vcard agent"
| style="text-align: right;" | 20
| style="text-align: right;" |
| style="text-align: center;" | MF
|Ümit Korkmaz loan return to Eintracht Frankfurt
|- class="vcard agent"
| style="text-align: right;" | 23
| style="text-align: right;" |
| style="text-align: center;" | MF
|Marc Rzatkowski on loan to Arminia Bielefeld
|- class="vcard agent"
| style="text-align: right;" | 25
| style="text-align: right;" |
| style="text-align: center;" | DF
|Antar Yahia to Al Nassr FC
|- class="vcard agent"
| style="text-align: right;" | 27
| style="text-align: right;" |
| style="text-align: center;" | FW
|Zlatko Dedič on loan to Dynamo Dresden
|- class="vcard agent"
| style="text-align: right;" | --
| style="text-align: right;" |
| style="text-align: center;" | GK
|Daniel Fernandes released, previously on loan at Panserraikos F.C.
|- class="vcard agent"
| style="text-align: right;" | --
| style="text-align: right;" |
| style="text-align: center;" | DF
|Christian Fuchs to 1. FSV Mainz 05, previously on loan
|- class="vcard agent"
| style="text-align: right;" | --
| style="text-align: right;" |
| style="text-align: center;" | FW
|Stanislav Šesták to MKE Ankaragücü, previously on loan
|}
|}

SpVgg Greuther Fürth

In:

|- class="vcard agent"
| style="text-align: right;" | 4 
| style="text-align: right;" |
| style="text-align: center;" | DF
|Kevin Kraus from Eintracht Frankfurt
|- class="vcard agent"
| style="text-align: right;" | 6 
| style="text-align: right;" |
| style="text-align: center;" | MF
|Heinrich Schmidtgal from Rot-Weiß Oberhausen
|- class="vcard agent"
| style="text-align: right;" | 10
| style="text-align: right;" |
| style="text-align: center;" | MF
|Sebastian Tyrała from VfL Osnabrück
|- class="vcard agent"
| style="text-align: right;" | 18
| style="text-align: right;" |
| style="text-align: center;" | DF
|Christian Dorda from Borussia Mönchengladbach
|- class="vcard agent"
| style="text-align: right;" | 21
| style="text-align: right;" |
| style="text-align: center;" | MF
|Robert Zillner from SpVgg Unterhaching
|- class="vcard agent"
| style="text-align: right;" | 22
| style="text-align: right;" |
| style="text-align: center;" | FW
|Dani Schahin loan return from Dynamo Dresden
|- class="vcard agent"
| style="text-align: right;" | 25
| style="text-align: right;" |
| style="text-align: center;" | FW
|Olivier Occean from Kickers Offenbach
|}
|}

Out:

|- class="vcard agent"
| style="text-align: right;" | 6 
| style="text-align: right;" |
| style="text-align: center;" | DF
|Kim Falkenberg to Alemannia Aachen
|- class="vcard agent"
| style="text-align: right;" | 10
| style="text-align: right;" |
| style="text-align: center;" | FW
|Miroslav Slepička loan return to Dinamo Zagreb
|- class="vcard agent"
| style="text-align: right;" | 11
| style="text-align: right;" |
| style="text-align: center;" | MF
|Burak Kaplan loan return to Bayer 04 Leverkusen
|- class="vcard agent"
| style="text-align: right;" | 18
| style="text-align: right;" |
| style="text-align: center;" | MF
|Leonhard Haas to FC Ingolstadt
|- class="vcard agent"
| style="text-align: right;" | 22
| style="text-align: right;" |
| style="text-align: center;" | GK
|Alexander Walke loan return to Red Bull Salzburg
|- class="vcard agent"
| style="text-align: right;" | 27
| style="text-align: right;" |
| style="text-align: center;" | MF
|Nicolai Müller to 1. FSV Mainz 05
|- class="vcard agent"
| style="text-align: right;" | 28
| style="text-align: right;" |
| style="text-align: center;" | FW
|Stefan Vogler on loan to Kickers Offenbach

|}
|}

FC Erzgebirge Aue

In:

|- class="vcard agent"
| style="text-align: right;" | 7 
| style="text-align: right;" |
| style="text-align: center;" | FW
|Ronny König from Rot-Weiß Oberhausen
|- class="vcard agent"
| style="text-align: right;" | 8 
| style="text-align: right;" |
| style="text-align: center;" | FW
|Mike Könnecke form VfL Wolfsburg II
|- class="vcard agent"
| style="text-align: right;" | 9 
| style="text-align: right;" |
| style="text-align: center;" | FW
|Christian Cappek from Wacker Burghausen
|- class="vcard agent"
| style="text-align: right;" | 23
| style="text-align: right;" |
| style="text-align: center;" | MF
|Nicolas Höfler on loan from SC Freiburg
|- class="vcard agent"
| style="text-align: right;" | 25
| style="text-align: right;" |
| style="text-align: center;" | FW
|Guido Koçer from SV Babelsberg 03
|}
|}

Out:

|- class="vcard agent"
| style="text-align: right;" | 3 
| style="text-align: right;" |
| style="text-align: center;" | DF
|Tomasz Kos retired
|- class="vcard agent"
| style="text-align: right;" | 7 
| style="text-align: right;" |
| style="text-align: center;" | DF
|Thomas Birk to Chemnitzer FC
|- class="vcard agent"
| style="text-align: right;" | 31
| style="text-align: right;" |
| style="text-align: center;" | MF
|Patrick Milchraum to Karlsruher SC
|}
|}

Energie Cottbus

In:

|- class="vcard agent"
| style="text-align: right;" | 3 
| style="text-align: right;" |
| style="text-align: center;" | MF
|Ivica Banović from SC Freiburg, previously on loan at MSV Duisburg
|- class="vcard agent"
| style="text-align: right;" | 6 
| style="text-align: right;" |
| style="text-align: center;" | FW
|Charles Uchenna Nwaogu from Flota Świnoujście
|- class="vcard agent"
| style="text-align: right;" | 8 
| style="text-align: right;" |
| style="text-align: center;" | FW
|Dimitar Rangelov on loan from Borussia Dortmund, previously on loan at Maccabi Tel Aviv
|- class="vcard agent"
| style="text-align: right;" | 9 
| style="text-align: right;" |
| style="text-align: center;" | FW
|Mustafa Kučuković from SønderjyskE
|- class="vcard agent"
| style="text-align: right;" | 11
| style="text-align: right;" |
| style="text-align: center;" | MF
|Alexander Ludwig from 1860 Munich
|- class="vcard agent"
| style="text-align: right;" | 19
| style="text-align: right;" |
| style="text-align: center;" | FW
|Tobias Steffen on loan from Bayer 04 Leverkusen II
|- class="vcard agent"
| style="text-align: right;" | 20
| style="text-align: right;" |
| style="text-align: center;" | MF
|Konstantin Engel from VfL Osnabrück
|- class="vcard agent"
| style="text-align: right;" | 22
| style="text-align: right;" |
| style="text-align: center;" | FW
|Martin Fenin from Eintracht Frankfurt
|- class="vcard agent"
| style="text-align: right;" | 37
| style="text-align: right;" |
| style="text-align: center;" | MF
|Christian Müller from Arminia Bielefeld
|- class="vcard agent"
| style="text-align: right;" | --
| style="text-align: right;" |
| style="text-align: center;" | DF
|Christopher Schorch on loan from 1. FC Köln
|}
|}

Out:

|- class="vcard agent"
| style="text-align: right;" | 6 
| style="text-align: right;" |
| style="text-align: center;" | MF
|Nils Miatke to FC Carl Zeiss Jena
|- class="vcard agent"
| style="text-align: right;" | 7 
| style="text-align: right;" |
| style="text-align: center;" | DF
|Takahito Soma to Vissel Kobe
|- class="vcard agent"
| style="text-align: right;" | 9 
| style="text-align: right;" |
| style="text-align: center;" | FW
|Emil Jula to MSV Duisburg
|- class="vcard agent"
| style="text-align: right;" | 20
| style="text-align: right;" |
| style="text-align: center;" | MF
|Shao Jiayi to MSV Duisburg
|- class="vcard agent"
| style="text-align: right;" | 22
| style="text-align: right;" |
| style="text-align: center;" | MF
|Heiko Schwarz to Wacker Burghausen
|- class="vcard agent"
| style="text-align: right;" | 26
| style="text-align: right;" |
| style="text-align: center;" | FW
|Nils Petersen to Bayern Munich

|}
|}

Fortuna Düsseldorf

In:

|- class="vcard agent"
| style="text-align: right;" | 1 
| style="text-align: right;" |
| style="text-align: center;" | GK
|Robert Almer from Austria Wien
|- class="vcard agent"
| style="text-align: right;" | 3 
| style="text-align: right;" |
| style="text-align: center;" | DF
|Juanan from Real Madrid Castilla
|- class="vcard agent"
| style="text-align: right;" | 4 
| style="text-align: right;" |
| style="text-align: center;" | MF
|Karim Aouadhi from Club Africain
|- class="vcard agent"
| style="text-align: right;" | 10
| style="text-align: right;" |
| style="text-align: center;" | FW
|Ken Ilsø from FC Midtjylland, previously on loan
|- class="vcard agent"
| style="text-align: right;" | 16
| style="text-align: right;" |
| style="text-align: center;" | FW
|Villyan Bijev on loan from Liverpool F.C.
|- class="vcard agent"
| style="text-align: right;" | 20
| style="text-align: right;" |
| style="text-align: center;" | FW
|Adriano Grimaldi from 1. FSV Mainz 05 II
|- class="vcard agent"
| style="text-align: right;" | 23
| style="text-align: right;" |
| style="text-align: center;" | FW
|Robbie Kruse from Melbourne Victory
|- class="vcard agent"
| style="text-align: right;" | 26
| style="text-align: right;" |
| style="text-align: center;" | MF
|Jules Schwadorf on loan from Bayer 04 Leverkusen II
|- class="vcard agent"
| style="text-align: right;" | 33
| style="text-align: right;" |
| style="text-align: center;" | GK
|Markus Krauss from VfB Stuttgart II
|}
|}

Out:

|- class="vcard agent"
| style="text-align: right;" | 1 
| style="text-align: right;" |
| style="text-align: center;" | GK
|Michael Melka to Rot-Weiß Oberhausen
|- class="vcard agent"
| style="text-align: right;" | 3 
| style="text-align: right;" |
| style="text-align: center;" | MF
|Claus Costa to VfL Osnabrück
|- class="vcard agent"
| style="text-align: right;" | 4 
| style="text-align: right;" |
| style="text-align: center;" | DF
|Tiago to Newcastle Jets
|- class="vcard agent"
| style="text-align: right;" | 10
| style="text-align: right;" |
| style="text-align: center;" | MF
|Marco Christ to SV Wehen Wiesbaden
|- class="vcard agent"
| style="text-align: right;" | 15
| style="text-align: right;" |
| style="text-align: center;" | FW
|Patrick Zoundi to 1. FC Union Berlin
|- class="vcard agent"
| style="text-align: right;" | 19
| style="text-align: right;" |
| style="text-align: center;" | FW
|Marcel Gaus to FSV Frankfurt
|}
|}

MSV Duisburg

In:

|- class="vcard agent"
| style="text-align: right;" | 2
| style="text-align: right;" |
| style="text-align: center;" | MF
|Vasileios Pliatsikas on loan from FC Schalke 04
|- class="vcard agent"
| style="text-align: right;" | 3
| style="text-align: right;" |
| style="text-align: center;" | DF
|Markus Bollmann from Arminia Bielefeld
|- class="vcard agent"
| style="text-align: right;" | 7 
| style="text-align: right;" |
| style="text-align: center;" | MF
|Daniel Brosinski from Wehen Wiesbaden
|- class="vcard agent"
| style="text-align: right;" | 9 
| style="text-align: right;" |
| style="text-align: center;" | FW
|Valeri Domovchiyski from Hertha BSC
|- class="vcard agent"
| style="text-align: right;" | 10
| style="text-align: right;" |
| style="text-align: center;" | MF
|Jürgen Gjasula from FSV Frankfurt
|- class="vcard agent"
| style="text-align: right;" | 13
| style="text-align: right;" |
| style="text-align: center;" | DF
|Sergei Karimov from VfL Wolfsburg
|- class="vcard agent"
| style="text-align: right;" | 17
| style="text-align: right;" |
| style="text-align: center;" | MF
|Kevin Wolze from VfL Wolfsburg
|- class="vcard agent"
| style="text-align: right;" | 23
| style="text-align: right;" |
| style="text-align: center;" | GK
|Florian Fromlowitz from Hannover 96
|- class="vcard agent"
| style="text-align: right;" | 27
| style="text-align: right;" |
| style="text-align: center;" | FW
|Emil Jula from Energie Cottbus
|- class="vcard agent"
| style="text-align: right;" | 28
| style="text-align: right;" |
| style="text-align: center;" | MF
|Daniel Beichler on loan from Hertha BSC, previously on loan at FC St. Gallen
|- class="vcard agent"
| style="text-align: right;" | 32
| style="text-align: right;" |
| style="text-align: center;" | FW
|Flamur Kastrati from FC Twente, previously on loan at VfL Osnabrück
|- class="vcard agent"
| style="text-align: right;" | 33
| style="text-align: right;" |
| style="text-align: center;" | MF
|Shao Jiayi from Energie Cottbus
|- class="vcard agent"
| style="text-align: right;" | --
| style="text-align: right;" |
| style="text-align: center;" | DF
|Stephen Hennen from MSV Duisburg II
|- class="vcard agent"
| style="text-align: right;" | --
| style="text-align: right;" |
| style="text-align: center;" | GK
|Felix Wiedewald from Werder Bremen
|- class="vcard agent"
| style="text-align: right;" | --
| style="text-align: right;" |
| style="text-align: center;" | DF
|Džemal Berberović from Litex Lovech
|}
|}

Out:

|- class="vcard agent"
| style="text-align: right;" | 1 
| style="text-align: right;" |
| style="text-align: center;" | GK
|Marcel Herzog released
|- class="vcard agent"
| style="text-align: right;" | 2 
| style="text-align: right;" |
| style="text-align: center;" | DF
|Julian Koch loan return to Borussia Dortmund
|- class="vcard agent"
| style="text-align: right;" | 4 
| style="text-align: right;" |
| style="text-align: center;" | MF
|Ivica Banović loan return to SC Freiburg
|- class="vcard agent"
| style="text-align: right;" | 10
| style="text-align: right;" |
| style="text-align: center;" | MF
|Filip Trojan loan return to 1. FSV Mainz 05
|- class="vcard agent"
| style="text-align: right;" | 11
| style="text-align: right;" |
| style="text-align: center;" | MF
|Olcay Şahan to 1. FC Kaiserslautern
|- class="vcard agent"
| style="text-align: right;" | 18
| style="text-align: right;" |
| style="text-align: center;" | GK
|David Yelldell to Bayer 04 Leverkusen
|- class="vcard agent"
| style="text-align: right;" | 19
| style="text-align: right;" |
| style="text-align: center;" | FW
|Stefan Maierhofer loan return to Wolverhampton Wanderers
|- class="vcard agent"
| style="text-align: right;" | 20
| style="text-align: right;" |
| style="text-align: center;" | MF
|Ivica Grlić retired
|- class="vcard agent"
| style="text-align: right;" | 22
| style="text-align: right;" |
| style="text-align: center;" | FW
|Manuel Schäffler loan return to 1860 Munich
|- class="vcard agent"
| style="text-align: right;" | 24
| style="text-align: right;" |
| style="text-align: center;" | MF
|Kevin Grund to Rot-Weiss Essen
|- class="vcard agent"
| style="text-align: right;" | 28
| style="text-align: right;" |
| style="text-align: center;" | DF
|Olivier Veigneau released
|- class="vcard agent"
| style="text-align: right;" | 32
| style="text-align: right;" |
| style="text-align: center;" | MF
|Sefa Yılmaz to Kayserispor
|- class="vcard agent"
| style="text-align: right;" | --
| style="text-align: right;" |
| style="text-align: center;" | MF
|Michael Blum to Hansa Rostock, previously on loan
|- class="vcard agent"
| style="text-align: right;" | --
| style="text-align: right;" |
| style="text-align: center;" | MF
|Yannick Stark to FSV Frankfurt, previously on loan at SV Darmstadt 98
|}
|}

TSV 1860 Munich

In:

|- class="vcard agent"
| style="text-align: right;" | --
| style="text-align: right;" |
| style="text-align: center;" | FW
|Manuel Schäffler loan return from MSV Duisburg
|- class="vcard agent"
| style="text-align: right;" | --
| style="text-align: right;" |
| style="text-align: center;" | MF
|Eke Uzoma loan return form Arminia Bielefeld
|- class="vcard agent"
| style="text-align: right;" | --
| style="text-align: right;" |
| style="text-align: center;" | MF
|Sandro Kaiser loan return from Arminia Bielefeld
|- class="vcard agent"
| style="text-align: right;" | --
| style="text-align: right;" |
| style="text-align: center;" | MF
|Arne Feick from Arminia Bielefeld
|- class="vcard agent"
| style="text-align: right;" | --
| style="text-align: right;" |
| style="text-align: center;" | DF
|Dennis Malura from Rot-Weiß Erfurt
|- class="vcard agent"
| style="text-align: right;" | --
| style="text-align: right;" |
| style="text-align: center;" | GK
|Timo Ochs from 1. FC Nürnberg
|- class="vcard agent"
| style="text-align: right;" | --
| style="text-align: right;" |
| style="text-align: center;" | DF
|Collin Benjamin from Hamburger SV
|}
|}

Out:

|- class="vcard agent"
| style="text-align: right;" | 3 
| style="text-align: right;" |
| style="text-align: center;" | DF
|Stefan Bell loan return to 1. FSV Mainz 05
|- class="vcard agent"
| style="text-align: right;" | 8 
| style="text-align: right;" |
| style="text-align: center;" | MF
|Aleksandar Ignjovski loan return to OFK Beograd
|- class="vcard agent"
| style="text-align: right;" | 12
| style="text-align: right;" |
| style="text-align: center;" | GK
|Philipp Tschauner to FC St. Pauli
|- class="vcard agent"
| style="text-align: right;" | 14
| style="text-align: right;" |
| style="text-align: center;" | MF
|Florin Lovin released
|- class="vcard agent"
| style="text-align: right;" | 18
| style="text-align: right;" |
| style="text-align: center;" | MF
|Alexander Ludwig to Energie Cottbus
|- class="vcard agent"
| style="text-align: right;" | 24
| style="text-align: right;" |
| style="text-align: center;" | DF
|Tobias Schilk on loan to 1. FC Heidenheim
|}
|}

Alemannia Aachen

In:

|- class="vcard agent"
| style="text-align: right;" | 2 
| style="text-align: right;" |
| style="text-align: center;" | DF
|Kim Falkenberg form SpVgg Greuther Fürth
|- class="vcard agent"
| style="text-align: right;" | 3 
| style="text-align: right;" |
| style="text-align: center;" | DF
|Andreas Korte from Alemannia Aachen II
|- class="vcard agent"
| style="text-align: right;" | 4 
| style="text-align: right;" |
| style="text-align: center;" | MF
|Kevin Maek from Werder Bremen II
|- class="vcard agent"
| style="text-align: right;" | 6 
| style="text-align: right;" |
| style="text-align: center;" | MF
|Bas Sibum from NEC
|- class="vcard agent"
| style="text-align: right;" | 7 
| style="text-align: right;" |
| style="text-align: center;" | FW
|Marco Stiepermann on loan from Borussia Dortmund
|- class="vcard agent"
| style="text-align: right;" | 10
| style="text-align: right;" |
| style="text-align: center;" | FW
|Anouar Hadouir from Roda JC
|- class="vcard agent"
| style="text-align: right;" | 11
| style="text-align: right;" |
| style="text-align: center;" | FW
|Fabian Bäcker from Borussia Mönchengladbach
|- class="vcard agent"
| style="text-align: right;" | 12
| style="text-align: right;" |
| style="text-align: center;" | GK
|Boy Waterman from AZ, previously on loan at De Graafschap
|- class="vcard agent"
| style="text-align: right;" | 14
| style="text-align: right;" |
| style="text-align: center;" | DF
|Mario Erb from Bayern Munich II
|- class="vcard agent"
| style="text-align: right;" | 18
| style="text-align: right;" |
| style="text-align: center;" | DF
|Jonas Strifler from Dynamo Dresden
|- class="vcard agent"
| style="text-align: right;" | 22
| style="text-align: right;" |
| style="text-align: center;" | DF
|Lennart Hartmann from Hertha BSC
|- class="vcard agent"
| style="text-align: right;" | --
| style="text-align: right;" |
| style="text-align: center;" | FW
|Henrik Ojamaa loan return from Fortuna Sittard
|- class="vcard agent"
| style="text-align: right;" | --
| style="text-align: right;" |
| style="text-align: center;" | MF
|Reinhold Yabo on loan from 1. FC Köln
|}
|}

Out:

|- class="vcard agent"
| style="text-align: right;" | 2 
| style="text-align: right;" |
| style="text-align: center;" | DF
|Nico Herzig to Wehen Wiesbaden
|- class="vcard agent"
| style="text-align: right;" | 7 
| style="text-align: right;" |
| style="text-align: center;" | MF
|Zoltán Stieber to 1. FSV Mainz 05
|- class="vcard agent"
| style="text-align: right;" | 10
| style="text-align: right;" |
| style="text-align: center;" | MF
|Thorsten Burkhardt to Wehen Wiesbaden
|- class="vcard agent"
| style="text-align: right;" | 14
| style="text-align: right;" |
| style="text-align: center;" | FW
|Babacar Gueye on loan to FSV Frankfurt
|- class="vcard agent"
| style="text-align: right;" | 18
| style="text-align: right;" |
| style="text-align: center;" | MF
|Tolgay Arslan loan return to Hamburger SV
|- class="vcard agent"
| style="text-align: right;" | 21
| style="text-align: right;" |
| style="text-align: center;" | FW
|Juvhel Tsoumou to Preston North End F.C.
|- class="vcard agent"
| style="text-align: right;" | 37
| style="text-align: right;" |
| style="text-align: center;" | MF
|Marco Höger to FC Schalke 04
|}
|}

1. FC Union Berlin

In:

|- class="vcard agent"
| style="text-align: right;" | 9 
| style="text-align: right;" |
| style="text-align: center;" | FW
|John Jairo Mosquera from Werder Bremen, previously on loan
|- class="vcard agent"
| style="text-align: right;" | --
| style="text-align: right;" |
| style="text-align: center;" | MF
|Markus Karl from FC Ingolstadt 04
|- class="vcard agent"
| style="text-align: right;" | --
| style="text-align: right;" |
| style="text-align: center;" | FW
|Simon Terodde on loan from 1. FC Köln
|- class="vcard agent"
| style="text-align: right;" | --
| style="text-align: right;" |
| style="text-align: center;" | FW
|Patrick Zoundi from Fortuna Düsseldorf
|- class="vcard agent"
| style="text-align: right;" | --
| style="text-align: right;" |
| style="text-align: center;" | MF
|Marc Pfertzel from AO Kavala
|- class="vcard agent"
| style="text-align: right;" | --
| style="text-align: right;" |
| style="text-align: center;" | FW
|Silvio from FC Zürich, previously on loan at FC Lausanne-Sport
|}
|}

Out:

|- class="vcard agent"
| style="text-align: right;" | 3 
| style="text-align: right;" |
| style="text-align: center;" | DF
|Dominic Peitz to FC Augsburg
|- class="vcard agent"
| style="text-align: right;" | 6 
| style="text-align: right;" |
| style="text-align: center;" | DF
|Bernd Rauw to Rot-Weiß Erfurt
|- class="vcard agent"
| style="text-align: right;" | 8 
| style="text-align: right;" |
| style="text-align: center;" | MF
|Macchambes Younga-Mouhani released
|- class="vcard agent"
| style="text-align: right;" | 10
| style="text-align: right;" |
| style="text-align: center;" | FW
|Santi Kolk on loan to NAC Breda
|- class="vcard agent"
| style="text-align: right;" | 11
| style="text-align: right;" |
| style="text-align: center;" | FW
|Kenan Şahin released
|- class="vcard agent"
| style="text-align: right;" | 13
| style="text-align: right;" |
| style="text-align: center;" | GK
|Christoph Haker to Berlin AK 07
|- class="vcard agent"
| style="text-align: right;" | 14
| style="text-align: right;" |
| style="text-align: center;" | MF
|Paul Thomik released
|- class="vcard agent"
| style="text-align: right;" | 22
| style="text-align: right;" |
| style="text-align: center;" | FW
|Karim Benyamina to FSV Frankfurt
|- class="vcard agent"
| style="text-align: right;" | 23
| style="text-align: right;" |
| style="text-align: center;" | MF
|Björn Brunnemann released
|}
|}

SC Paderborn 07

In:

|- class="vcard agent"
| style="text-align: right;" | 8
| style="text-align: right;" |
| style="text-align: center;" | FW
|Matt Taylor from Rot Weiss Ahlen
|- class="vcard agent"
| style="text-align: right;" | 9
| style="text-align: right;" |
| style="text-align: center;" | FW
|Nick Proschwitz from FC Thun
|- class="vcard agent"
| style="text-align: right;" | 10
| style="text-align: right;" |
| style="text-align: center;" | MF
|Mehmet Kara from Preußen Münster
|- class="vcard agent"
| style="text-align: right;" | 14
| style="text-align: right;" |
| style="text-align: center;" | FW
|Thomas Bertels from SC Verl
|- class="vcard agent"
| style="text-align: right;" | 17
| style="text-align: right;" |
| style="text-align: center;" | MF
|Alban Meha from Eintracht Trier
|- class="vcard agent"
| style="text-align: right;" | 24
| style="text-align: right;" |
| style="text-align: center;" | GK
|Jens Grahl on loan from 1899 Hoffenheim
|- class="vcard agent"
| style="text-align: right;" | 30
| style="text-align: right;" |
| style="text-align: center;" | DF
|Jens Wissing from Borussia Mönchengladbach
|- class="vcard agent"
| style="text-align: right;" | 31
| style="text-align: right;" |
| style="text-align: center;" | FW
|Sven Krause loan return form 1. FC Saarbrücken
|- class="vcard agent"
| style="text-align: right;" | --
| style="text-align: right;" |
| style="text-align: center;" | GK
|Sebastian Lange loan return from SC Wiedenbrück 2000
|}
|}

Out:

|- class="vcard agent"
| style="text-align: right;" | 3 
| style="text-align: right;" |
| style="text-align: center;" | DF
|Jukka Raitala loan return to 1899 Hoffenheim
|- class="vcard agent"
| style="text-align: right;" | 4 
| style="text-align: right;" |
| style="text-align: center;" | DF
|Toni Wachsmuth to Chemnitzer FC
|- class="vcard agent"
| style="text-align: right;" | 10
| style="text-align: right;" |
| style="text-align: center;" | FW
|Edmond Kapllani loan return to FC Augsburg
|- class="vcard agent"
| style="text-align: right;" | 22
| style="text-align: right;" |
| style="text-align: center;" | GK
|Daniel Masuch to Preußen Münster
|- class="vcard agent"
| style="text-align: right;" | 25
| style="text-align: right;" |
| style="text-align: center;" | MF
|Stefan Parensen released
|- class="vcard agent"
| style="text-align: right;" | 27
| style="text-align: right;" |
| style="text-align: center;" | DF
|Thomas Rath to SC Paderborn 07 II
|- class="vcard agent"
| style="text-align: right;" | 34
| style="text-align: right;" |
| style="text-align: center;" | MF
|Adrian Jevrić released
|}
|}

FSV Frankfurt

In:

|- class="vcard agent"
| style="text-align: right;" | 8 
| style="text-align: right;" |
| style="text-align: center;" | MF
|Vyacheslav Hleb from Dinamo Minsk
|- class="vcard agent"
| style="text-align: right;" | 22
| style="text-align: right;" |
| style="text-align: center;" | FW
|Karim Benyamina from 1. FC Union Berlin
|- class="vcard agent"
| style="text-align: right;" | --
| style="text-align: right;" |
| style="text-align: center;" | FW
|Marcel Gaus from Fortuna Düsseldorf
|- class="vcard agent"
| style="text-align: right;" | --
| style="text-align: right;" |
| style="text-align: center;" | GK
|Pierre Kleinheider from 1. FSV Mainz 05 II
|- class="vcard agent"
| style="text-align: right;" | --
| style="text-align: right;" |
| style="text-align: center;" | DF
|Nils Texeira from Kickers Offenbach
|- class="vcard agent"
| style="text-align: right;" | --
| style="text-align: right;" |
| style="text-align: center;" | MF
|Daniel Gordon from Rot-Weiß Oberhausen
|- class="vcard agent"
| style="text-align: right;" | --
| style="text-align: right;" |
| style="text-align: center;" | MF
|Ju Tae Yun from Yonsei University
|- class="vcard agent"
| style="text-align: right;" | --
| style="text-align: right;" |
| style="text-align: center;" | DF
|Alexander Huber from Kickers Offenbach
|- class="vcard agent"
| style="text-align: right;" | --
| style="text-align: right;" |
| style="text-align: center;" | FW
|Babacar Gueye on loan from Alemannia Aachen
|- class="vcard agent"
| style="text-align: right;" | --
| style="text-align: right;" |
| style="text-align: center;" | DF
|Alexander Ujma from FSV Frankfurt Youth
|- class="vcard agent"
| style="text-align: right;" | --
| style="text-align: right;" |
| style="text-align: center;" | DF
|Tobias Henneböle from FSV Frankfurt Youth
|- class="vcard agent"
| style="text-align: right;" | --
| style="text-align: right;" |
| style="text-align: center;" | FW
|Macauley Chrisantus on loan from Hamburger SV, previously on loan at Karlsruher SC
|- class="vcard agent"
| style="text-align: right;" | --
| style="text-align: right;" |
| style="text-align: center;" | MF
|Yannick Stark from MSV Duisburg, previously on loan at SV Darmstadt 98
|- class="vcard agent"
| style="text-align: right;" | --
| style="text-align: right;" |
| style="text-align: center;" | MF
|Zafer Yelen from Trabzonspor
|}
|}

Out:

|- class="vcard agent"
| style="text-align: right;" | 4 
| style="text-align: right;" |
| style="text-align: center;" | DF
|Kai-Fabian Schulz loan return to Hamburger SV
|- class="vcard agent"
| style="text-align: right;" | 6 
| style="text-align: right;" |
| style="text-align: center;" | MF
|Christian Müller to RB Leipzig
|- class="vcard agent"
| style="text-align: right;" | 7 
| style="text-align: right;" |
| style="text-align: center;" | MF
|Jaouhar Mnari released
|- class="vcard agent"
| style="text-align: right;" | 8 
| style="text-align: right;" |
| style="text-align: center;" | MF
|Mike Wunderlich on loan to Viktoria Köln
|- class="vcard agent"
| style="text-align: right;" | 9 
| style="text-align: right;" |
| style="text-align: center;" | FW
|Sascha Mölders to FC Augsburg
|- class="vcard agent"
| style="text-align: right;" | 10
| style="text-align: right;" |
| style="text-align: center;" | MF
|Jürgen Gjasula to FC Augsburg
|- class="vcard agent"
| style="text-align: right;" | 15
| style="text-align: right;" |
| style="text-align: center;" | FW
|Uğur Albayrak released
|- class="vcard agent"
| style="text-align: right;" | 17
| style="text-align: right;" |
| style="text-align: center;" | DF
|Stefan Hickl to Kickers Offenbach
|- class="vcard agent"
| style="text-align: right;" | 19
| style="text-align: right;" |
| style="text-align: center;" | GK
|Pablo Álvarez released
|- class="vcard agent"
| style="text-align: right;" | 24
| style="text-align: right;" |
| style="text-align: center;" | MF
|Benjamin Pintol released
|- class="vcard agent"
| style="text-align: right;" | 27
| style="text-align: right;" |
| style="text-align: center;" | FW
|Aziz Bouhaddouz to SV Wehen Wiesbaden
|- class="vcard agent"
| style="text-align: right;" | 30
| style="text-align: right;" |
| style="text-align: center;" | FW
|Cidimar to Dynamo Dresden
|}
|}

FC Ingolstadt 04

In:

|- class="vcard agent"
| style="text-align: right;" | 3 
| style="text-align: right;" |
| style="text-align: center;" | DF
|Andreas Schäfer from Karlsruher SC
|- class="vcard agent"
| style="text-align: right;" | 7 
| style="text-align: right;" |
| style="text-align: center;" | MF
|Christoph Knasmüllner from Internazionale
|- class="vcard agent"
| style="text-align: right;" | 8 
| style="text-align: right;" |
| style="text-align: center;" | MF
|Leonhard Haas from SpVgg Greuther Fürth
|- class="vcard agent"
| style="text-align: right;" | 13
| style="text-align: right;" |
| style="text-align: center;" | MF
|José-Alex Ikeng from Werder Bremen II
|- class="vcard agent"
| style="text-align: right;" | 20
| style="text-align: right;" |
| style="text-align: center;" | DF
|Kristoffer Andersen from VfL Osnabrück
|- class="vcard agent"
| style="text-align: right;" | 21
| style="text-align: right;" |
| style="text-align: center;" | GK
|Ramazan Özcan from 1899 Hoffenheim
|- class="vcard agent"
| style="text-align: right;" | 22
| style="text-align: right;" |
| style="text-align: center;" | FW
|Ahmed Akaïchi from Étoile du Sahel
|}
|}

Out:

|- class="vcard agent"
| style="text-align: right;" | 2 
| style="text-align: right;" |
| style="text-align: center;" | DF
|Amaechi Igwe released
|- class="vcard agent"
| style="text-align: right;" | 8 
| style="text-align: right;" |
| style="text-align: center;" | MF
|Markus Karl to 1. FC Union Berlin
|- class="vcard agent"
| style="text-align: right;" | 11
| style="text-align: right;" |
| style="text-align: center;" | FW
|Sebastian Zielinsky released
|- class="vcard agent"
| style="text-align: right;" | 12
| style="text-align: right;" |
| style="text-align: center;" | GK
|Michael Lutz to Waldhof Mannheim
|- class="vcard agent"
| style="text-align: right;" | 21
| style="text-align: right;" |
| style="text-align: center;" | FW
|Márkó Futács loan return to Werder Bremen
|}
|}

Karlsruher SC

In:

|- class="vcard agent"
| style="text-align: right;" | --
| style="text-align: right;" |
| style="text-align: center;" | MF
|Marcus Piossek from Rot Weiss Ahlen
|- class="vcard agent"
| style="text-align: right;" | --
| style="text-align: right;" |
| style="text-align: center;" | DF
|Dennis Kempe form VfR Aalen
|- class="vcard agent"
| style="text-align: right;" | --
| style="text-align: right;" |
| style="text-align: center;" | GK
|Dirk Orlishausen from Rot-Weiß Erfurt
|- class="vcard agent"
| style="text-align: right;" | --
| style="text-align: right;" |
| style="text-align: center;" | FW
|Anton Fink loan return from VfR Aalen
|- class="vcard agent"
| style="text-align: right;" | --
| style="text-align: right;" |
| style="text-align: center;" | FW
|Bogdan Müller from FC Schalke 04 II
|- class="vcard agent"
| style="text-align: right;" | --
| style="text-align: right;" |
| style="text-align: center;" | FW
|Moses Lamidi from Rot-Weiß Oberhausen
|- class="vcard agent"
| style="text-align: right;" | --
| style="text-align: right;" |
| style="text-align: center;" | MF
|Patrick Milchraum from Erzgebirge Aue
|- class="vcard agent"
| style="text-align: right;" | --
| style="text-align: right;" |
| style="text-align: center;" | MF
|Timo Kern from Karlsruher SC II
|- class="vcard agent"
| style="text-align: right;" | --
| style="text-align: right;" |
| style="text-align: center;" | DF
|Florian Lechner from FC St. Pauli
|- class="vcard agent"
| style="text-align: right;" | --
| style="text-align: right;" |
| style="text-align: center;" | MF
|Steffen Haas from Kickers Offenbach
|- class="vcard agent"
| style="text-align: right;" | --
| style="text-align: right;" |
| style="text-align: center;" | DF
|Niklas Hoheneder from Sparta Prague, previously on loan at Austria Wien
|- class="vcard agent"
| style="text-align: right;" | --
| style="text-align: right;" |
| style="text-align: center;" | FW
|Klemen Lavrič from FC St. Gallen
|- class="vcard agent"
| style="text-align: right;" | --
| style="text-align: right;" |
| style="text-align: center;" | DF
|Giuseppe Aquaro from CSKA Sofia
|}
|}

Out:

|- class="vcard agent"
| style="text-align: right;" | 2 
| style="text-align: right;" |
| style="text-align: center;" | DF
|Matthias Zimmermann to Borussia Mönchengladbach
|- class="vcard agent"
| style="text-align: right;" | 5 
| style="text-align: right;" |
| style="text-align: center;" | DF
|Christian Demirtas released
|- class="vcard agent"
| style="text-align: right;" | 6 
| style="text-align: right;" |
| style="text-align: center;" | MF
|Stefan Rieß to FC Lustenau 07
|- class="vcard agent"
| style="text-align: right;" | 8 
| style="text-align: right;" |
| style="text-align: center;" | MF
|Michael Mutzel released
|- class="vcard agent"
| style="text-align: right;" | 10
| style="text-align: right;" |
| style="text-align: center;" | MF
|Massimilian Porcello released
|- class="vcard agent"
| style="text-align: right;" | 11
| style="text-align: right;" |
| style="text-align: center;" | DF
|Andreas Schäfer to FC Ingolstadt 04
|- class="vcard agent"
| style="text-align: right;" | 15
| style="text-align: right;" |
| style="text-align: center;" | FW
|Niklas Tarvajärvi on loan to Turun Palloseura
|- class="vcard agent"
| style="text-align: right;" | 18
| style="text-align: right;" |
| style="text-align: center;" | FW
|Macauley Chrisantus loan return to Hamburger SV
|- class="vcard agent"
| style="text-align: right;" | 19
| style="text-align: right;" |
| style="text-align: center;" | FW
|Serhat Akın released
|- class="vcard agent"
| style="text-align: right;" | 22
| style="text-align: right;" |
| style="text-align: center;" | MF
|Marco Engelhardt released
|- class="vcard agent"
| style="text-align: right;" | 23
| style="text-align: right;" |
| style="text-align: center;" | DF
|Matthias Langkamp released
|- class="vcard agent"
| style="text-align: right;" | 24
| style="text-align: right;" |
| style="text-align: center;" | DF
|Sebastian Langkamp to FC Augsburg
|- class="vcard agent"
| style="text-align: right;" | 26
| style="text-align: right;" |
| style="text-align: center;" | MF
|Lukas Rupp to Borussia Mönchengladbach
|- class="vcard agent"
| style="text-align: right;" | 29
| style="text-align: right;" |
| style="text-align: center;" | GK
|Kristian Nicht released
|- class="vcard agent"
| style="text-align: right;" | 41
| style="text-align: right;" |
| style="text-align: center;" | FW
|Denis Omerbegović released
|- class="vcard agent"
| style="text-align: right;" | 42
| style="text-align: right;" |
| style="text-align: center;" | DF
|Kiliann Witschi released
|- class="vcard agent"
| style="text-align: right;" | 45
| style="text-align: right;" |
| style="text-align: center;" | DF
|Martin Hudec to VfL Osnabrück
|}
|}

Eintracht Braunschweig

In:

|- class="vcard agent"
| style="text-align: right;" | 18
| style="text-align: right;" |
| style="text-align: center;" | MF
|Oliver Petersch from Rot-Weiß Oberhausen
|- class="vcard agent"
| style="text-align: right;" | 20
| style="text-align: right;" |
| style="text-align: center;" | MF
|Nico Zimmermann from 1. FC Saarbrücken
|- class="vcard agent"
| style="text-align: right;" | 21
| style="text-align: right;" |
| style="text-align: center;" | FW
|Pierre Merkel from SC Idar-Oberstein
|}
|}

Out:

|- class="vcard agent"
| style="text-align: right;" | 10
| style="text-align: right;" |
| style="text-align: center;" | FW
|Marco Calamita to VfR Aalen
|- class="vcard agent"
| style="text-align: right;" | 20
| style="text-align: right;" |
| style="text-align: center;" | MF
|Dennis Lemke to FC Carl Zeiss Jena
|- class="vcard agent"
| style="text-align: right;" | 21
| style="text-align: right;" |
| style="text-align: center;" | MF
|Patrick Amrhein to SpVgg Unterhaching
|- class="vcard agent"
| style="text-align: right;" | 38
| style="text-align: right;" |
| style="text-align: center;" | FW
|Karim Bellarabi to Bayer Leverkusen
|}
|}

Hansa Rostock

In:

|- class="vcard agent"
| style="text-align: right;" | 2 
| style="text-align: right;" |
| style="text-align: center;" | DF
|Pavel Košťál from SC Wiener Neustadt
|- class="vcard agent"
| style="text-align: right;" | 11
| style="text-align: right;" |
| style="text-align: center;" | MF
|Marek Mintál from 1. FC Nürnberg
|- class="vcard agent"
| style="text-align: right;" | 17
| style="text-align: right;" |
| style="text-align: center;" | MF
|Timo Perthel from Werder Bremen, previously on loan at Sturm Graz
|- class="vcard agent"
| style="text-align: right;" | 18
| style="text-align: right;" |
| style="text-align: center;" | MF
|Michael Blum from MSV Duisburg, previously on loan
|- class="vcard agent"
| style="text-align: right;" | 33
| style="text-align: right;" |
| style="text-align: center;" | FW
|Tino Semmer from Rot-Weiß Erfurt
|}
|}

Out:

|- class="vcard agent"
| style="text-align: right;" | 9
| style="text-align: right;" |
| style="text-align: center;" | MF
|Daniel Becker released
|- class="vcard agent"
| style="text-align: right;" | 11
| style="text-align: right;" |
| style="text-align: center;" | FW
|Enrico Neitzel to Anker Wismar
|- class="vcard agent"
| style="text-align: right;" | 14
| style="text-align: right;" |
| style="text-align: center;" | FW
|Malick Bolivard to SV Babelsberg 03
|- class="vcard agent"
| style="text-align: right;" | 17
| style="text-align: right;" |
| style="text-align: center;" | DF
|René Lange released
|- class="vcard agent"
| style="text-align: right;" | 21
| style="text-align: right;" |
| style="text-align: center;" | GK
|Andreas Kerner to RB Leipzig
|- class="vcard agent"
| style="text-align: right;" | 23
| style="text-align: right;" |
| style="text-align: center;" | MF
|Hendrik Großöhmichen released
|- class="vcard agent"
| style="text-align: right;" | 24
| style="text-align: right;" |
| style="text-align: center;" | MF
|Tom Trybull to Werder Bremen
|- class="vcard agent"
| style="text-align: right;" | 32
| style="text-align: right;" |
| style="text-align: center;" | DF
|Martin Stoll to Dynamo Dresden

|}
|}

Dynamo Dresden

In:

|- class="vcard agent"
| style="text-align: right;" | 1 
| style="text-align: right;" |
| style="text-align: center;" | GK
|Dennis Eilhoff from Arminia Bielefeld
|- class="vcard agent"
| style="text-align: right;" | 3 
| style="text-align: right;" |
| style="text-align: center;" | MF
|Alexander Schnetzler from VfL Osnabrück
|- class="vcard agent"
| style="text-align: right;" | 4 
| style="text-align: right;" |
| style="text-align: center;" | DF
|Cheikh Gueye from FC Metz
|- class="vcard agent"
| style="text-align: right;" | 5 
| style="text-align: right;" |
| style="text-align: center;" | DF
|Romain Brégerie from FC Metz, previously on loan at LB Châteauroux
|- class="vcard agent"
| style="text-align: right;" | 7 
| style="text-align: right;" |
| style="text-align: center;" | MF
|Marcel Heller from Eintracht Frankfurt
|- class="vcard agent"
| style="text-align: right;" | 8 
| style="text-align: right;" |
| style="text-align: center;" | MF
|Filip Trojan from 1. FSV Mainz 05, previously on loan at MSV Duisburg
|- class="vcard agent"
| style="text-align: right;" | 9 
| style="text-align: right;" |
| style="text-align: center;" | MF
|Pavel Fořt from Arminia Bielefeld
|- class="vcard agent"
| style="text-align: right;" | 10
| style="text-align: right;" |
| style="text-align: center;" | FW
|Mickaël Poté from OGC Nice, previously on loan at Le Mans FC
|- class="vcard agent"
| style="text-align: right;" | 16
| style="text-align: right;" |
| style="text-align: center;" | DF
|Martin Stoll from Hansa Rostock
|- class="vcard agent"
| style="text-align: right;" | 18
| style="text-align: right;" |
| style="text-align: center;" | FW
|Cidimar from FSV Frankfurt
|- class="vcard agent"
| style="text-align: right;" | 19
| style="text-align: right;" |
| style="text-align: center;" | MF
|Yiannis Papadopoulos from Olympiacos
|- class="vcard agent"
| style="text-align: right;" | 20
| style="text-align: right;" |
| style="text-align: center;" | MF
|Marvin Knoll on loan from Hertha BSC
|- class="vcard agent"
| style="text-align: right;" | 22
| style="text-align: right;" |
| style="text-align: center;" | FW
|Zlatko Dedič on loan from VfL Bochum
|- class="vcard agent"
| style="text-align: right;" | 33
| style="text-align: right;" |
| style="text-align: center;" | DF
|Jens Möckel from Rot-Weiß Erfurt
|- class="vcard agent"
| style="text-align: right;" | 37
| style="text-align: right;" |
| style="text-align: center;" | DF
|Toni Leistner from Dynamo Dresden II
|}
|}

Out:

|- class="vcard agent"
| style="text-align: right;" | 1 
| style="text-align: right;" |
| style="text-align: center;" | GK
|Axel Keller to Heidenauer SV
|- class="vcard agent"
| style="text-align: right;" | 3 
| style="text-align: right;" |
| style="text-align: center;" | DF
|Tim Kister to VfR Aalen
|- class="vcard agent"
| style="text-align: right;" | 4 
| style="text-align: right;" |
| style="text-align: center;" | MF
|Denny Herzig to Eintracht Trier
|- class="vcard agent"
| style="text-align: right;" | 5 
| style="text-align: right;" |
| style="text-align: center;" | DF
|Thomas Hübener to Arminia Bielefeld
|- class="vcard agent"
| style="text-align: right;" | 8 
| style="text-align: right;" |
| style="text-align: center;" | MF
|Timo Röttger to RB Leipzig
|- class="vcard agent"
| style="text-align: right;" | 10
| style="text-align: right;" |
| style="text-align: center;" | FW
|Dani Schahin loan return to SpVgg Greuther Fürth
|- class="vcard agent"
| style="text-align: right;" | 18
| style="text-align: right;" |
| style="text-align: center;" | MF
|Jonas Strifler to Alemannia Aachen
|- class="vcard agent"
| style="text-align: right;" | 20
| style="text-align: right;" |
| style="text-align: center;" | MF
|Thomas Franke to TSG Neustrelitz
|- class="vcard agent"
| style="text-align: right;" | 21
| style="text-align: right;" |
| style="text-align: center;" | DF
|Dennis Bührer to Bahlinger SC
|- class="vcard agent"
| style="text-align: right;" | 22
| style="text-align: right;" |
| style="text-align: center;" | DF
|Florian Grossert to SV Babelsberg 03
|- class="vcard agent"
| style="text-align: right;" | 26
| style="text-align: right;" |
| style="text-align: center;" | MF
|Maik Wagefeld to Hallescher FC
|- class="vcard agent"
| style="text-align: right;" | 33
| style="text-align: right;" |
| style="text-align: center;" | FW
|Alexander Esswein to 1. FC Nürnberg
|}
|}

See also
 2011–12 Bundesliga
 2011–12 2. Bundesliga

References

External links
 Official site of the DFB 
 kicker.de 
 Official site of the Bundesliga 
 Official site of the Bundesliga

Germany
Trans
2011